

Events

January 1899 

 January 1
 Spanish rule ends in Cuba, concluding 400 years of the Spanish Empire in the Americas.
 Queens and Staten Island become administratively part of New York City.
 January 2 – 
Bolivia sets up a customs office in Puerto Alonso, leading to the Brazilian settlers there to declare the Republic of Acre in a revolt against Bolivian authorities. 
The first part of the Jakarta Kota–Anyer Kidul railway on the island of Java is opened between Batavia Zuid (Jakarta Kota) and Tangerang.
 January 3 – Hungarian Prime Minister Dezső Bánffy fights an inconclusive duel with his bitter enemy in parliament, Horánszky Nándor.
 January 4 – 
U.S. President William McKinley's declaration of December 21, 1898, proclaiming a policy of benevolent assimilation of the Philippines as a United States territory, is announced in Manila by the U.S. commander, General Elwell Otis, and angers independence activists who had fought against Spanish rule.
The American Society of Landscape Architects, still in existence 123 years later, is founded.
 January 5 – A fierce battle is fought between American troops and Filipino defenders at the town of Pililla on the island of Luzon. The Filipinos retreat to the mountains at Tanay.
 January 6 – Lord Curzon becomes Viceroy of India.
 January 7 – The Lucky Star, an English comic opera composed by Ivan Caryll and produced by the D'Oyly Carte Opera Company premieres at the Savoy Theatre in London for the first of 143 performances.
 January 8 – The Association football club SK Rapid Wien is founded in Vienna.
 January 9 –
After a successful revolt against the Ottoman Empire by the inhabitants of the island of Crete, the area, which joins Greece, gets its first constitution, with provisions for a provincial legislature with 138 Christian deputies and 50 Muslim deputies.
 George F. Hoar, a U.S. Senator for Massachusetts, speaks out in the Senate against American expansion into the Philippines.  The text of Hoar's is sent by cable to Hong Kong at a cost of $4,000, and is later cited by Ambassador John Barrett on January 13, 1900, as an incitement to Filipino attacks on U.S. troops. 
 January 10 – The Tau Kappa Epsilon fraternity is founded, at Illinois Wesleyan University in Bloomington, Illinois.
 January 11 – The Steel Plate Transferrers' Association, the first labor union for workers skilled in siderography (the engraving and mass reproduction of steel plates for newspaper printing) is established. After changing its name to the International Association of Siderographers, it had 80 members at its peak. It dissolves in 1991, with only eight members left.
 January 12 – A massive rescue by the Lynmouth Lifeboat Station, using 100 men and requiring the transport of the lifeboat Louisa over land and then out to sea, succeeds in saving all 18 men aboard.  The event is later made famous in the children's book The Overland Launch.
 January 13 – The Canadian Northern Railway is established, on January 13, 1899
 January 14 – 
The White Star Line ship RMS Oceanic, at the time the largest British ocean liner up to that time, is launched from the Irish port of Belfast in front of over 50,000 people. It will begin its maiden voyage on September 6.
The British four-masted sailing ship Andelana capsizes during a storm in Commencement Bay off the coast of the U.S. state of Washington, with the loss of all 17 of her crew.
 January 15 – The name of Puerto Rico is changed by the new U.S. military government to "Porto Rico". It will not be changed back until May 17, 1932. 
 January 16 – Eduardo Calceta is appointed as Chief of the Army (Jefe General) of the rebel Philippine Republic army by Emilio Aguinaldo.
 January 17 – The United States takes possession of Wake Island in the Pacific Ocean.
 January 18 – The General Assembly of the U.S. state of Pennsylvania begins the task of filling the U.S. Senate seat of Matthew Quay, who had recently resigned after being indicted on criminal charges.  After 79 ballots and three months, no candidate has a majority, and the General Assembly refuses to approve the governor's appointment of a successor, and the seat remains vacant for more than two years. The Pennsylvania experience later leads to the 17th Amendment to the U.S. Constitution to provide for U.S. Senators to be directly elected by popular vote, rather than by the state legislatures.
 January 19 – 
The Anglo-Egyptian Sudan is formed (it is disbanded in 1956).
Future film producer Samuel Goldwyn, born in Poland and later a resident of Germany and England, arrives in the United States at the age of sixteen as Szmuel Gelbfisz.
 January 20 – The Schurman Commission is created by U.S. President William McKinley to study the issue of the American approach to he sovereignty of the Philippines, ceded to the U.S. on December 10 by Spain.  The five-man group, chaired by Cornell University President Jacob Schurman, later concludes that the Philippines will need to become financially independent before a republic can be created. 
 January 21
 Opel Motors opens for business in Germany.
 The Malolos Constitution is ratified in the Province of Bulacan by the Revolutionary Government of the Philippines.

 January 22 – The leaders of six Australian colonies meet in Melbourne, to discuss the confederation of Australia as a whole.
 January 23
 Emilio Aguinaldo is sworn in, as President of the First Philippine Republic.
Mubarak Al-Sabah, the emir of Kuwait, signs the Anglo-Kuwaiti Agreement of 1899 a secret treaty with the British Empire to accept protectorate status for the Middle Eastern sheikdom in return for British protection of Kuwaiti territory.
 The British Southern Cross Expedition crosses the Antarctic Circle.
 January 24 – The Philadelphia College of Osteopathic Medicine, one of the oldest medical schools in the United States, is founded.
 January 25 – The city of Ponce, Puerto Rico is saved from disaster by seven firemen and one volunteer civilian who disobey orders and stop "El Polverin", a fire near the U.S. Army's store of explosive artillery. A "Monument to the Heroes of El Poverin" is later erected in their honor. 
 January 26 – 
U.S. Representative George Henry White of North Carolina, the only African-American in Congress at the time, delivers his first major speech, speaking out against disenfranchisement of black voters and proposing that the number of representatives from a U.S. state should be based on the number of persons of voting age who actually cast ballots, rather than population. "
German inventor Karl Ferdinand Braun, who will later share the 1909 Nobel Prize in Physics with Guglielmo Marconi, receives British Patent No. 1899-1862 for his wireless radio invention "Telegraphy without directly connected wire".
Jenatzy's speed is more than 20% faster than the January 17 mark of  set by Gaston de Chasseloup-Laubat.
 January 28
At a time when U.S. Senators are elected by the state legislature rather than by ballot, wealthy businessman William A. Clark is elected senator by the Montana state legislature after offering bribes to most of its members. The U.S. Senate refuses to seat him after evidence of the bribery is revealed.
The League of Peja, organized by Haxhi Zeka to lobby for a Kosovar Albanian state within the Ottoman Empire, attracts 450 delegates to its first convention, held at the city of Peja, now in the Republic of Kosovo.
 January 29 – A lawyer for the estate of John W. Keely, an inventor who had persuaded investors in his Keely Motor Company that an automobile could be created that would operate from Keely's "induction resonance motion motor" that had achieved perpetual motion, reveals that the late Mr. Keely's motor had been a fraud, and that the widow knew nothing of it.
 January 30 – Dimitar Grekov is appointed as Prime Minister of Bulgaria by King Ferdinand I, but removed from office less than 10 months later on October 13.
 January 31 – Cherokee Nation voters in the Indian Territory (later the U.S. state of Oklahoma) approve a proposition to allot Cherokee lands and to dissolve the Cherokee government, but the U.S. Congress never ratifies the results.

February 1899 
 February 1 – 
Ranavalona III, who had been the Queen of Madagascar until being deposed on February 28, 1897, is sent into exile by French colonial authorities, along with the rest of the royal family.  She departs on the ship Yang-Tse on a 28-day trip to Marseilles.
The Suntory whisky distiller in Japan is opened by Shinjiro Torii in Osaka as a store selling imported wines.
 February 2 – The participants in the Australian Premiers' Conference, held in Melbourne, agree that Australia's capital (Canberra) should be located between Sydney and Melbourne.
 February 3 – Kansas University's new college basketball team, coached by the game's inventor, Dr. James Naismith, plays its first game, and is defeated by the YMCA team of Kansas City, Kansas, 16 to 5.
 February 4 – 
The Philippine–American War begins as hostilities break out in Manila.
Rudyard Kipling's poem "The White Man's Burden" is first published, appearing in The Times of London.  A response to the United States occupation of the Philippine Islands, and exhorting members of the White race to be responsible for benevolent civilizing of the world's "non-white" people, the poem is reprinted in The New York Sun the next day.
 February 5 – The first major battle of the Philippine–American War concludes with the capture by the U.S. of the San Juan River Bridge that connects Manila and San Juan.  U.S. Army General Arthur MacArthur Jr. directs troops of the U.S. Army Eighth Corps to victory over Filipino troops commanded by General Antonio Luna.  In the two-day battle, 55 U.S. soldiers and 238 Filipino soldiers are killed.
 February 6 – A peace treaty between the United States and Spain is ratified by the United States Senate by a vote of 57 to 27 to end the Spanish–American War. 
 February 7 – Elections are held in Greece for the 235 seats of the Hellenic Parliament.  Supporters of the late Charilaos Trikoupis win 110 seats, 8 short of a majority, and Trikoupis's successor, Georgios Theotokis forms a government as Prime Minister.
 February 8 – Protesting against the government of Russia breaks out at Saint Petersburg University and mounted police violently respond to the group, causing a riot.
 February 9 – The Dodge Commission exonerates the U.S. Department of War from responsibility in the United States Army beef scandal, where meatpacking companies supplied low-grade, putrefied beef to American soldiers during the Spanish American War and caused an unquantified number of cases of food poisoning.  While War Secretary Russell Alger is not accused of criminal negligence, the Commission implies that he was incompetent and he is later forced to resign.
 February 10 – 
U.S. Army troops, supported by bombardment from the warships Charleston and Monandock, defeat Filipino forces in the Battle of Caloocan and get control of the Manila to Dagupan railway. Colonel W. S. Metcalfe is later accused by some of his men of having ordered the shooting of Filipino soldiers taken prisoner. 
Future U.S. President Herbert Hoover and his fiancée Lou Henry, both 24, are married at her parents' home in Monterey, California, and depart the next day for a 14-month stay in China, where Hoover works as a mining engineer.
 February 12 – The Great Blizzard of 1899 strikes the east coast of the United States, causing subzero temperatures as far south as southern Florida for two days and destroying the citrus fruit crop that year.
 February 13 – In New York, the White Star ocean liner SS Germanic, already laden with ice and snow during its voyage from Liverpool, becomes even more weighed down after disembarking its passengers when the New York City blizzard strikes. With  of added weight, the ship begins to list sideways and additional weight enters cargo doors that had been opened for refuelling.  Germanic remains on the bottom New York Harbor for more than a week while salvaging goes on, then requires refurbishing for three months, but becomes operational again.
 February 14 – Voting machines are approved by the U.S. Congress, for use in federal elections.
 February 15 – The February Manifesto is issued by the Emperor of Russia, decreeing that a veto by the Diet of Finland may be overruled in legislative matters concerning the interest of all Russia, including autonomous Finland. The manifesto is viewed as unconstitutional and a coup d'état by many Finns, who have come to consider their country a separate constitutional state in its own right, in union with the Russian Empire. Furthermore, the manifesto also fails to elaborate the criteria that a law has to meet in order to be considered to concern Russian imperial interests, and not an internal affair of Finland (affairs over which the Diet's authority is supposed have remained unaltered), leaving it to be decided by the autocratic Emperor. This results in Finnish fears that the Diet of Finland may be overruled arbitrarily.
 February 16 – 
Félix Faure, the President of France since 1895, dies of a stroke in his office while engaged in sexual activity with his mistress, Marguerite Steinheil.
Knattspyrnufélag Reykjavíkur, the first Association football club in Iceland, is established in the island's capital, Reykjavík.
 February 17 – The research vessel SS Southern Cross, on an Antarctic expedition led by Carsten Borchgrevink, arrives at Cape Adare and begins unloading 90 sledge dogs— the first ever on the continent and two Norwegian Sámi crewmen, Per Savio and Ole Must, who become the first humans to spend the night in Antarctica.  Over the next 12 days, the rest of the 31-man crew brings in supplies builds a temporary settlement.
 February 18 – The National Assembly of France elects a new President to fill out the remainder of the late President Faure's term. Senate President Émile Loubet wins the vote, 483 to 278, against Prime Minister Jules Méline.
 February 19 – In Venezuela, the former Minister of War, Major General Ramón Guerra, angry with the reforms of President Ignacio Andrade, proclaims the state of Guárico as an independent territory.  President Andrade orders General Augusto Lutowsky to crush the rebellion and Guerra flees to Colombia, but later comes back as Minister of War.
 February 20 – Discussions among members of a joint Anglo-American commission, set up by U.S. President William McKinley and Canadian Prime Minister Wilfrid Laurier to resolve the Alaska boundary dispute, end abruptly after it is clear that the U.S. will not make any concessions.  In response, Laurier makes clear that there will be no further concessions with the U.S. in trade.
 February 21 – 
Gdadebo II, the Alake of Egba in what is now southeast Nigeria, signs an agreement with the British Governor of Lagos Colony to lease lands for construction of a new railway from Aro to Abeokuta.
The British freighter SS Jumna, with the capacity to carry more than 500 people, but hauling a load of coal with minimal crew, is last seen passing Rathlin Island at Northern Ireland.  Bound from Scotland to deliver a shipment of coal to Uruguay, it never arrives and is never seen again.
The Vicksburg National Military Park is established in Mississippi to preserve the battlefield of the Battle of Vicksburg that was fought in 1863 during the American Civil War.
 February 22 – Convention Hall, which later hosts two national political conventions, opens in Kansas City, Missouri with a concert by the band of John Philip Sousa.  The building burns down less than 14 months later.
 February 23 – In France, Paul Déroulède and Jules Guérin of the right-wing Ligue des Patriotes attempt to persuade General Georges-Gabriel de Pellieux to lead a coup d'état during the funeral of the late president Félix Faure in order to overthrow President Loubet. General Pellieux refuses to participate. Later in the year, Déroulède and Guérin are indicted for conspiracy against the government and banished from France.
 February 24 – The works of Catholic priest and theologian Herman Schell, including the recently published Der Katholicismus als Princip des Fortschritts and Die neue Zeit und der alte Glaubeare placed by the Roman Catholic Church on its Index Librorum Prohibitorum, the list of banned books.
 February 25 – In an accident at Grove Hill, Harrow, London, England, Edwin Sewell becomes the world's first driver of a petrol-driven vehicle to be killed; his passenger, Maj. James Richer, dies of injuries three days later.
 February 26 – Dezső Bánffy resigns as Prime Minister of the Kingdom of Hungary, at the time a partner in the Austro-Hungarian Empire, and is succeeded by Kálmán Széll.
 February 27 – Japanese immigration to South America, primarily the nation of Peru, begins as the ship Sakura Maru departs from Yokohama with 790 men employed by the Morioka-shokai Sugar Company.  The group arrives in Callao on April 3. 
 February 28 – U.S. President William McKinley approves a law increasing the pension to American Civil War veterans, both Union and Confederate, to $25.00 per month.

March 1899 
 March 1 – In Afghanistan, Capt. George Roos-Keppel makes a sudden attack on a predatory band of Chamkannis that have been raiding in the Kurram Valley, and captures 100 prisoners with 3,000 head of cattle. 
 March 2 – Mount Rainier National Park is established, in the U.S. state of Washington. 
 March 3 – Guglielmo Marconi conducts radio beacon experiments on Salisbury Plain in England and notices that radio waves are being reflected back to the transmitter by objects they encounter, one of the early steps in the potential for developing radar. 
 March 4 – Cyclone Mahina strikes Bathurst Bay, Queensland. A 12 meter high wave reaches up to 5 km inland, leaving over 400 dead (the deadliest natural disaster in Australia's history).

 March 5 – George B. Selden sells the rights to his patent for an internal combustion engine to the Electric Vehicle Company, and he and the company then claim a royalty on all automobiles using such an engine. 
 March 6 – In Berlin, Bayer registers aspirin as a trademark.
 March 7 – The Provisional Law on the Judiciary is issued in the Philippines to provide for the selection of a Chief Justice. 
 March 8 – The Frankfurter Fußball-Club Victoria von 1899 (predecessor of Eintracht Frankfurt Association football club) is founded.
 March 9 – Japan promulgates its commercial code, the Shōhō, to take effect on June 16.  The Shōhō, as amended applies to Japanese business today.
 March 10 – 
The U.S. state of Delaware enacts its general corporation act that makes it the most important jurisdiction in United States corporate law.
At the Battle of Balantang, the U.S. Army sustains 400 casualties in an attack by Philippine troops under the command of Pascual Magbanua.
 March 11 – 
A wireless distress signal is sent for the first time by a patrol boat to aid the endangered British cruiser Elbe.  The Morse code distress signal is heard by the lighthouse near Ramsgate Lifeboat Station, which sends a lifeboat to the rescue.
Waldemar Jungner files the patent application for the first alkaline battery and receives Swedish patent number 11132.
 March 12 – Encinal County, Texas, created on February 1, 1856, near the U.S. city of Laredo on the condition that it would create a county seat, is discontinued and annexed into neighboring Webb County. The largest town in the area, Bruni, has less than 400 people.
 March 13 – Chelan County, Washington is created from Okanogan and Kittitas counties for the area around Wenatchee.
 March 14 – 
After a civil war breaks out in Samoa between Malietoa Tanumafili I (recognized by Germany, the UK and the U.S.) and rebels who recognize Mata'afa Iosefo as the island's king, the USS Philadelphia takes control of the capital at Apia. 
Germany's Kaiser Wilhelm II takes direct command of the Imperial Navy.
 March 15 – Santa Cruz County is established in the southeast corner of Pima County around the city of Nogales (built across from the border of the larger Mexican city of Nogales, Sonora) in the U.S. territory of Arizona.
 March 16 – Memorial ceremonies are held for the burial of the late German hero Otto von Bismarck and his wife, Johanna von Puttkamer with their re-interment at the Bismarck Mausoleum, now a tourist attraction at Friedrichsruh in Aumühle.  Bismarck, who had died on July 30, had been buried along with his wife at the estate of his home in Varzin, now the city of Warcino in Poland.
 March 17 – A fire kills 86 people at the Windsor Hotel in New York City.
 March 18 – Phoebe, the ninth-known moon of the planet Saturn is discovered by U.S. astronomer William Pickering from analysis of photographic plates made by a Peruvian observatory seven months earlier, the first discovery of a satellite photographically.
 March 19 – 
One of the first labor unions for government employees is formed with the organization in Denmark of the Copenhagen Municipal Workers' Union
The Battle of Taguig takes place in the Philippines as the USS Laguna de Bay bombards the Katipunan stronghold. 
 March 20 – At Sing Sing prison in Ossining, New York, Martha M. Place becomes the first woman to be executed in an electric chair.
 March 21 – The Eden Theatre in La Ciotat, a small city in France near Marseilles, lays a claim to being the first cinema as brothers Auguste Lumière and Louis Lumière present their short film, L'Arrivée d'un train en gare de La Ciotat ("The Arrival of a Train at La Ciotat") to 250 surprised spectators.  The action film shows a steam train pulling into La Ciotat station, passengers coming out of the cars, and departing passengers climbing on.
 March 22 – The coronation of Malietoa Tanumafili I as King of Samoa takes place.  He had become the Malieota of the South Pacific island when his father died on August 22.
 March 23 – The U.S. cruiser USS Philadelphia and the Royal Navy cruisers HMS Porpoise and HMS Royalist bombard rebel-held villages in Samoa after an attack on Apia.
 March 24 – 
The U.S. Ambassador to Argentina, acting as arbitrator of a boundary dispute between Argentina and Chile, awards the disputed territory to Chile.
George Dewey is made Admiral of the U.S. Navy.
 March 25 – The rowing team of Cambridge University wins the annual boat race against Oxford University for the first time in a decade, finishing ahead of Oxford by 3 1⁄4 lengths on the Thames. Oxford had won the race nine times in a row from 1890 to 1898.
 March 26 – In the first major action in the Malolos Campaign in the Philippine–American War, 90 Filipino soldiers are killed in the Battle of the Meycauayan bridge
 March 27
 Guglielmo Marconi successfully transmits a radio signal across the English Channel.
 In the Battle of Marilao River, Filipino forces under the personal command of Emilio Aguinaldo, President of the Philippines, fail to prevent troops of the United States Army crossing the river.
 March 28 – Alfred Martineau becomes the new French colonial governor of French Somaliland in northeast Africa, now the Republic of Djibouti
 March 29 – The First Philippine Republic relocates its capital from Malolos to San Isidro, Nueva Ecija as the government flees an invasion of U.S. forces.
 March 30 – The British steamer Stella sinks in the English Channel with the loss of 80 people after wrecking against Les Casquets, a group of rocks near the Channel Islands.
 March 31 – 
The United Kingdom announces that it has completed the purchase of rights to occupy the Kingdom of Tonga.
In the Philippine–American War, Malolos, capital of the First Philippine Republic, is captured by American forces.

April 1899 
 April 1 – The Second Battle of Vailele takes place in Samoa as rebels loyal to King Mata'afa Iosefo force the retreat of American and British troops assisting Samoans loyal to Prince Tanumafili.
 April 2 – The Hamburg America Line cruise ship SS Graf Waldersee begins its maiden voyage.
 April 3 – The ship Sakura Maru brings 790 Japanese immigrants to the Peruvian port of Callao as the first persons from Japan to be accepted to live in South America.
 April 4 – 
Cuba's General Assembly voted to disband the Cuban army and to dissolve to accept U.S. sovereignty.
The German Imperial Navy warship SMS Jaguar, which will be scuttled after losing the 1914 Siege of Tsingtao, begins service. 
 April 5 – A team of five European geologists and 30 African laborers sets out from Northern Rhodesia to explore the minerals of central Africa for the British company Tanganyika Concessions, Ltd. (TCL).  Discovering that the most valuable copper deposits are in the Congo Free State, TCL makes an unsuccessful attempt to purchase full rights from King Leopold of Belgium.
 April 6 – In an elaborate military ceremony, 336 of the 385 American soldiers killed in the Spanish–American War are interred at the Arlington National Cemetery.
 April 7 – The Shootout at Wilson Ranch, the last major gunfight of the Wild West era in the U.S., takes place in Tombstone, Arizona.  Brothers William Halderman and Thomas Halderman, kill two lawmen.  They will later be hanged on November 16, 1900.
 April 8 – The Victors, the famous fight song for University of Michigan sports, is premiered at Ann Arbor, Michigan by John Philip Sousa and his band.  A student orchestra had played the music three days earlier for a smaller student audience.
 April 9 – 
In Uganda, King Chwa II Kabalega of the Bunyoro kingdom, a leader of the fight against British colonial occupation, is taken prisoner after being shot in a battle near Hoima.  Kabalega is exiled to the Seychelles in the South Pacific ocean and remains there until 1923.
The Greek ship Maria sinks after a collision with the British steamer Kingswell in the Mediterranean and 45 people drown.
The Battle of Santa Cruz begins in the Philippines between U.S. Army troops and nationalists of the First Philippine Republic.  After a two day battle, 93 Filipino fighters and one American soldier are dead.
 April 10 – Seven people are shot and killed in a gun battle at the Springside Mine at Pana, Illinois, between striking white union coal miners, and African-Americans hired as strikebreakers by the company. Five of the dead are black, including the wife of one of the non-union miners, along with one white miner and a white sheriff's deputy.
 April 11 – U.S. President William McKinley declares the Spanish-American War to be at an end as the Treaty of Paris between the U.S. and Spain goes into effect.  Ratifications are exchanged between McKinley and French Ambassador Jules Cambon on behalf of Spain. Puerto Rico, the Philippines and Guam are ceded to the U.S. and Cuba becomes an American protectorate.
 April 12 – Bolivia's President Severo Fernández is overthrown in a military coup d'état led by General José Manuel Pando.
 April 13 – The British freighter City of York departs from the U.S. port of San Francisco with a crew of 27 and a cargo of Oregon timber bound for Fremantle in Australia, but never reaches its destination, wrecking on the reefs at Rottnest Island on July 12.
 April 14 – British Army troops in Hong Kong attack the Walled City of Kowloon on orders of colonial Governor Henry Blake, based on intelligence that Chinese Imperial Army troops have been stationed behind the walls to subvert Britain's 1898 lease. By April 19, the British commander discovers that the Chinese troops had already departed and that only 150 civilians remain.
 April 15 – Students at the University of California, Berkeley steal the Stanford Axe from Stanford University, yelling at leaders following a baseball game, thus establishing the Axe as a symbol of the rivalry between the schools.
 April 16 – 
Voting is held in Spain for the 402 seats of the Congreso de los Diputados, and the Conservative Union wins a majority with 233 members. Voting for the Senate of Spain takes place on April 30.
Britain formally claims possession of the "New Territories" as an extension of its lease of Hong Kong to cover the area south of the Sham Chun River and 230 island in Kowloon Bay.
 April 17 – The first elections for the 10-member Legislative Council of the British colony of Southern Rhodesia (now Zimbabwe), limited to European candidates and voters. 
 April 18 – The Local Government (Ireland) Act 1898 goes into effect, creating 32 counties of Ireland (six which would become Northern Ireland) and abolishes the counties corporate of Carrickfergus and Drogheda.
 April 19 – France adds the Kingdom of Laos, a protectorate since 1893, to the existing colony of French Indochina.
 April 20 – The controversial ballet Le Cygne, choreographed by Madame Mariquita and written by Catulle Mendès, premieres at the Opéra-Comique in Paris, but is considered by critics to be too sexually explicit.
 April 21 – The nova V606 Aquilae is first observed from Earth as seen within the constellation Aquila.  It fades within six months.
 April 22 – In aid of the Royal Niger Company, the British Army begins an invasion of Esanland,  in southwestern Nigeria, to halt the resistance of the Esan chiefs still resistant to European rule.  After Benin King Ologbosere is overcome, the British attack the kingdom at Ekpoma. 
 April 23 – The steamship General Whitney sinks off the coast of St. Augustine, Florida.  While everyone on board escapes in lifeboats, one of the boats capsizes, drowning the captain and 16 other crew.
 April 24 – The Scottish ship Loch Sloy is wrecked off the coast of Australia's Kangaroo Island, drowning 32 of the 35 people on board.
 April 25 – Voting is held for the 169-seat National Assembly in Bulgaria, and the Radoslava Party wins a majority.
 April 26 – Jean Sibelius's First Symphony premieres in Finland at Helsinki.
 April 27 – In Australia, the Apostolic Church of Queensland receives formal recognition as a religious denomination.
 April 28 – The United Kingdom and the Russian Empire sign the Anglo-Russian Agreement formalizing their spheres of influence in China, essentially agreeing that Britain will not seek railway concessions north of the Great Wall of China, and Russia will avoid doing the same in the Yangtze River valley in southern China.
 April 30 – In the Philippines, the U.S. establishes a protectorate over the Republic of Negros, a semi-independent government for Negros Island, separate from the rest of the Philippine Islands.  The Republic exists until its annexation to the rest of the U.S. territory on April 20, 1901.

May 1899 
 May 1 – U.S. Navy Admiral George Dewey reports that 10 officers and crew of the ship USS Yorktown have been taken prisoner by the Philippine republic.
 May 2 – The Kingdom of Siam (now Thailand) cedes its province of Luang Prabang (now Laos) to France.
 May 3 – 
Francisco Silvela becomes the new Prime Minister of Spain after the resignation on March 7 of Práxedes Sagasta in the wake of Spain's loss of its overseas territories during the Spanish-American War.
The Ferencvárosi TC Association football club is founded in Budapest.
 May 4 – 
The thoroughbred horse Manuel, ridden by Fred Taral, wins the 25th running of the Kentucky Derby.
Inventor John Matthias Stroh applies for the patent for his new invention, the "Stroh violin", a stringed musical instrument with an amplifying horn attached.  British Patent No. GB9418 is granted on March 24, 1900.
 May 5 – The village of Stirling, Alberta is founded in Canada as a Mormon colony of 30 American settlers from Richfield, Utah, led by Theodore Brandley
 May 6 – The first democratic elections in Philippine history are held in for a municipal government for Baliuag in the province of Bulacan.
 May 7 – The capital of the First Philippine Republic is moved by President Emilio Aguinaldo from Manolos to Angeles City
 May 8 – In the French West African colony of Niger, French Army Captain Paul Voulet carries out the massacre of the Hausa inhabitants of the village of Birni-N'Konni in retaliation for the continued resistance of Queen Sarraounia.
 May 9 – The first KNVB Cup of the Royal Dutch Football Association is won by RAP Amsterdam in extra time, 1 to 0, over HVV Den Haag.
 May 10 – Finnish farmworker Karl Emil Malmelin kills seven people with an axe at the Simola croft in the village of Klaukkala.
 May 11 – Alberto Santos-Dumont attempts the first test flight of his Airship No. 2, but rain cools the hydrogen during the ship's inflation and a gust of wind blows it into nearby trees, where it is destroyed.
 May 12 – The first trade union for railway employees in Sweden, the Svenska Järnvägsmannaförbundet (Sweden Railworkers' League) is founded.  It lasts until 1970, when it merges into a labor union of Swedish government employees.
 May 13 – 
A train wreck near Reading, Pennsylvania kills 28 people and injures 50. 
The Esporte Clube Vitória Association football club is founded in Salvador, Brazil.
 May 14 – The three time world champion Club Nacional de Football is founded in Montevideo, Uruguay.
 May 15 – A clue to the fate of the British freighter Pelican, which disappeared in October 1897 along with 40 crew, is found in a message in a bottle that washes ashore at Portage Bay, Alaska.
 May 16 – 
British troops in the leased Chinese territory of Hong Kong take control of the city of Kowloon. 
The last Spaniards remaining in the Philippine Islands, after the cession to the U.S., depart from the island of Basilan.
 May 17 – In the Philippines, U.S. Army troops capture the city of San Isidro, Nueva Ecija, where Philippine Republic president Aguinaldo had moved his capital, but find that the insurgents had already left.
 May 18 – The First Hague Peace Conference is opened in The Hague by Willem de Beaufort, Minister of Foreign Affairs of the Netherlands.
 May 19 – The U.S. Army captures Tawi-Tawi, the southernmost island in the Philippines.
 May 20 – 
Jacob German, a New York City cab driver, becomes the first motor vehicle operator in the U.S. to be arrested for speeding when he is caught driving his electric taxi , more than twice the speed limit on Lexington Avenue.
The American Physical Society is founded at a meeting at Columbia University in New York by 36 physicists, with a mission ""to advance and diffuse the knowledge of physics."
 May 21 – 
The creature is not seen again after the lone encounter.
The town of Porosow in Poland (now Porazava in Belarus) is destroyed by fire.
 May 22 – The unrecognized República Selvática— the "Jungle Republic" is proclaimed by Peruvian Army Colonel Emilio Vizcarra in three provinces in Northern Peru located within the Amazon rainforest, Loreto, San Martín and Ucayali. The "republic" is reincorporated into Peru after Vizcarra's death on February 27, 1900.
 May 23 – Major General Henry W. Lawton and his troops arrive in Manolos, capital of the First Philippine Republic, after a 120-mile march in 20 days that had captured 28 towns with a loss of only six men.
 May 24 – 
Jules Massenet's Cendrillon, the first opera based on the fairy tale of Cinderella, premieres in Paris at the theater of the Opéra-Comique.
The 80th birthday of Queen Victoria is celebrated throughout the British Empire.
 May 25 – 
Pope Leo XIII issues the encyclical Annum sacrum, declaring 1900 to be a Holy Year and directing Roman Catholic churches worldwide to carry out the consecration of all human beings to the Sacred Heart of Jesus.
A fire in the Candian city of Saint John, New Brunswick, destroys 150 buildings and renders over 1,000 people homeless.
 May 26 – The guns of the British warship HMS Scylla, commanded by Captain Percy Scott, hit their targets 56 out of 70 times after Percy and his crew solve the problem of aiming a ship cannon on rolling seas.
 May 27 – 
Rangers F.C., commonly called the Glasgow Rangers and one of the most successful soccer football teams in the Scottish Football League, is incorporated.
Maurice Ravel's Shéhérazade Overture, is given its first public performance, 
 May 28 – General Vicente Álvarez forms the short-lived Republic of Zamboanga in the Philippines on a peninsula on the island of Mindanao.  The nation exists until 1903 when it is consolidated by the U.S. to the rest of the Philippine territory.
 May 29 – The Spanish system of courts in the Philippines, closed since the American occupation began, is revived under U.S. sovereignty and regulation.
 May 31 – 
 The Harriman Alaska Expedition is launched.
 The Bloemfontein Conference commences between Paul Kruger and Sir Alfred Milner in the Orange Free State, but ends in failure after six days.

June 1899 
 June 2 – American outlaws Robert L. Parker (Butch Cassidy) and Harry A. Longabaugh ("The Sundance Kid") commit their first armed robbery as "The Wild Bunch", stopping a Union Pacific train near Wilcox, Wyoming, with accomplices Harvey Logan and Elzy Lay, and steal more than $30,000 worth of cargo.
 June 3 – 
France's Court of Cassation orders a reopening of the 1894 conviction for treason of French Army Captain Alfred Dreyfus after evidence of a wrongful conviction is made public, and directs that Dreyfus be returned to France after five years of imprisonment on Devil's Island off of the coast of South America.
The United States and Spain resume diplomatic relations, as U.S. President McKinley receives the Duke of Arcos as the new Minister for Spain.
 June 4 – The President of France, Émile Loubet, is assaulted at the Longchamp Racecourse while watching the annual Grand Steeplechase.  His attacker, Fernand de Christiani, who beats him with a cane while Loubet is sitting in the grandstand.  De Christiani receives a four-year prison sentence nine days later.
 June 5 – General Antonio Luna, Commander of the Philippine Revolutionary Army, is assassinated along with his chief aide, Colonel Paco Román, after being lured to Cabanatuan by President Emilio Aguinaldo.
 June 6 – The U.S. military government of the Philippines directs that the 1885 Alien Contract Labor Law, which prohibits the importation of foreign workers into the United States, be applied to bringing persons other than Americans into the Philippines.
 June 7 – The Automobile Club of America is founded by a group of racers attending a meeting at the Waldorf-Astoria Hotel in New York City, with a purpose of promoting "the sport of automobilism". 
 June 8 – 
The Frederick Douglass Monument, the first statue in the U.S. to memorialize a specific African-American person, in unveiled in Douglass's hometown of Rochester, New York.
Saint Gemma Galgani experiences stigmata in the form of wounds corresponding to those sustained by Jesus Christ during his crucifixion; her family physician concludes that Galgani's stigmata were actually self-inflicted wounds from a sewing needle. 
 June 9 – American boxer James J. Jeffries wins the world heavyweight boxing championship when he knocks out Cornish-born Bob Fitzsimmons in the 11th round of a bout at Coney Island at Brooklyn, New York.
 June 10 – 
Under the terms of the Samoa Tripartite Convention, Germany, the United Kingdom and the United States form a colonial government to administer a protectorate over the islands of Samoa, with each nation providing an administrative consul to decide on the island's relations with foreign powers.  The government lasts less than nine months, and Germany annexes the western part of Samoa on March 1, 1900, leaving the U.S. to control what is now American Samoa.
French classical composer Ernest Chausson dies at the age of 44, not long after his career begins to flourish, when his bicycle crashes into a brick wall as he is riding down a hill. The death is ruled to be an accident, although later biographers speculate that Chausson committed suicide.
 June 11 – Pope Leo XIII issues a declaration of the consecration of the entire human race, whether Christian or non-Christian, to the Sacred Heart of Jesus.  The consecration follows the issuance of his papal encyclical Annum sacrum, declaring 1900 to be a Holy Year and directing all Roman Catholic churches in the world to implement the Prayer of Consecration to the Sacred Heart during the period of June 9 to June 11, 1899.  At the time, an estimated 1.6 billion people are on Earth.
 June 12 – 
The New Richmond tornado completely destroys the town of New Richmond, Wisconsin, killing 117 and injuring more than 200.
France's Prime Minister Charles Dupuy and his cabinet announce their resignations after losing a vote of confidence in the Chamber of Deputies.
 June 13 – The village of Herman, Nebraska, with a population of 319, is destroyed by a tornado and 40 people are killed.
 June 14 – Hiram M. Hiller Jr., William Henry Furness III and Alfred Craven Harrison Jr. set off on their third research expedition to gather archeological, cultural, zoological, and botanical specimens for museums, with a focus on South Asia and Australia.
 June 15 – 
Sweden's Department of Foreign Affairs hosts a conference for delegates from Germany, Denmark, Norway, the UK, the Netherlands, Russia and Sweden to make agreements on fishing in the Arctic Ocean, the Baltic Sea and the North Sea.
Cycle & Carriage, one of the largest companies in Singapore, is founded.
 June 16 – 
Japan's commercial code, the Shōhō, goes into effect after having been promulgated on March 9.  The Shōhō, as amended, applies to Japanese business today. The new code replaces the Kyu-shoho that had come into force on July 1, 1893.
The United States and Barbados sign a trade treaty.
 June 17 – David Hilbert creates the modern concept of geometry, with the publication of his book Grundlagen der Geometrie, released on this date at Göttingen. 
 June 18 – The Federación Libre de Trabajadores is created in Puerto Rico by anarchists Santiago Iglesias, Ramón Romero Rosa and Eduardo Conde as a resistance movement against the United States.
 June 19 – 
The Anglo-Egyptian Sudan is created in northeast Africa to be as a territory to be administered jointly by Egypt and the United Kingdom, through an Egyptian governor-general appointed with consent of the UK, although in practice it becomes administered as part of the British Empire. The arrangement will continue for more than 50 years until the overthrow of the Egyptian monarchy in 1952 and the granting of independence to the Republic of Sudan in 1956.
Edward Elgar's Enigma Variations premieres in London.
 June 20 – 
Voters in the British colony of New South Wales overwhelmingly approve a resolution to join the proposed Federation of Australia.
The right-wing nationalist movement Action Française is formed in France
 June 21 – 
"Treaty 8", the most comprehensive of the eleven Numbered Treaties, is signed between the British Crown on behalf of Canada, with various Cree groups of the First Nations (Kapawe'no, Sucker Creek Cree, Driftpile, Swan River), ceding  of land in the northern parts of Alberta, Saskatchewan, and British Columbia, as well as a portion of the Northwest Territories, to the Canadian government.
 June 22– Pierre Waldeck-Rousseau forms a new government to become Prime Minister of France
 June 23 – 
William H. Thompkins, Dennis Bell, Fitz Lee and George H. Wanton are awarded the Medal of Honor for their heroism in the Spanish–American War during the rescue of a stranded landing party while under enemy fire.  The four men, all members of the Buffalo Soldiers of the U.S. Army, become the last African-Americans to be selected for the Medal of Honor for more than half a century.
The Kingdom of Siam (now Thailand) and the Russian Empire sign a Declaration of Jurisdiction, Trade and Navigation at Bangkok.
 June 24 – 
Spain cedes its last Pacific Ocean colonies, the Caroline Islands (now part of the Federated States of Micronesia, the Ladrone islands of Ladrone (now part of the Mariana Islands), and Palau, to Germany.
The Australia national rugby union team plays its first game, a 13-3 loss to at team representing Great Britain.
 June 25 – Three Denver newspapers publish a story (later proved to be a fabrication) that the Chinese government under the Guangxu Emperor is going to demolish the Great Wall of China.
 June 26 – Joseph Chamberlain, the British Secretary of State for the Colonies, sets into motion the Second Boer War after receiving an appeal from the British Cape Colony in South Africa to help British subjects oppressed in the Transvaal Republic.  Chamberlain declares "We have reached a critical point in the history of the Empire," and war begins on October 11.
 June 27 – 
The paperclip is patented by Johan Vaaler, a Norwegian inventor.
A. E. J. Collins, a 13-year-old schoolboy, completes four afternoons of cricket with the highest-ever recorded individual score, 628 not outs. Collins never plays first-class cricket and is killed in action in 1914 during World War One, but his record will stand for 117 years until a 15-year old boy in India, Pranav Dhanawade scores 1,009 not out in 2016.
 June 28 – In Nigeria, British authorities publicly hang King Ologbosere Irabor outside of the courthouse at Benin City, days after he was captured and convicted of ordering the massacre of a party dispatched by the British consul. 
 June 29 – The mayor of Muskegon, Michigan, James Balbirnie, is assassinated by a disappointed office-seeker, J. W. Tayer, who then kills himself.
Murphy pedals his bike one mile in 57.8 seconds for an average speed of 62.28 miles per hour.

July 1899 
 July 1 – The International Council of Nurses is founded in London, at a meeting of the Matron's Council of Great Britain and Ireland.
 July 2 – Pope Leo XIII venerates four missionaries who were executed in Asia as martyrs of the Roman Catholic Church. Jean-Charles Cornay will be canonized as a saint in 1988, while Paul Liu Hanzuo, Peter Lieou and Louis Gabriel Taurin Dufresse will be canonized 100 years after their veneration by Pope John Paul II on October 1, 2000.
 July 3 – Swiss-born American boxer Frank Erne wins the world lightweight championship by defeating champion George "Kid" Lavigne in a decision after 20 rounds in Buffalo, New York.
 July 4 – The most famous skeleton of a dinosaur ever found intact, a Diplodicus, is discovered at the Sheep Creek Quarry in the western United States near Medicine Bow, Wyoming.  The expedition team, financed by Andrew Carnegie for the Carnegie Museum of Natural History in Pittsburgh and led by William Harlow Reed, bestows the name "Dippy" on the Diplodicus carnegii, which becomes well known after Carnegie has plaster cast replicas made for donation to museums all over the world.  The diplodicus dinosaurs are estimated to have roamed in North America more than 152,000,000 years ago.
 July 5 – 
In Chicago, the first juvenile court in the United States, the Cook County Circuit Court Juvenile Justice Division, hears its first cases with R. S. Tuthill as its judge.
The 1895 Trade and Navigation agreement between the Japanese and Russian empires goes into effect, with each country was given "a full freedom of ship and cargo entrance to all places, ports, and rivers on the other country's territory."
 July 6 – An assassin attempts to kill Milan Obrenović, who had been King of Serbia before abdicating in 1889, and had more recently been appointed by his son, King Alexander, as Commander-in-chief of the Serbian Army.  General Obrenović is uninjured, but begins a campaign to seek out and arrest the radicals in Serbia.
 July 7 – The Great Lakes Towing Company (GLT), now part of The Great Lakes Group, is incorporated by John D. Rockefeller and William G. Mather to acquire more than 150 tugboats to control shipping in four of the North American Great Lakes (Lake Huron, Lake Michigan, Lake Erie and Lake Superior) and quickly builds a monopoly on Great Lakes traffic.
 July 8 – In the U.S., the Lorelei Fountain, sculpted by Ernst Herter from white marble, is unveiled in the Bronx in New York City across from the Bronx County Courthouse.
 July 9 – The Latin American Plenary Council, called by Pope Leo XIII on December 25 for the Roman Catholic bishops of lands in Central America and South America to address the question of "how to guard the interests of the Latin race", closes in Rome after six weeks.  The bishops agree that Catholics should not "to celebrate with heretics" (specifically, non-Catholics) in religious ceremonies or to attend heretic church services, on pain of excommunication; that every republic in Latin America should have "a truly Catholic University" for education in the "sciences, literature and the good arts"; that missionary work to the Indian populations is "the grave duty of the ecclesiastical as well as civil authority to carry civilization to the tribes that remain faithless"; and that priests should be encouraged to study at the Pius Latin American Seminary in Rome.
 July 10 – 
British colonial authorities in the Anglo-Egyptian Sudan give control of the Red Sea port of Suakin to Sudan, after having agreed on January 19 that Egypt would have the right to administer commerce there. 
The Allegan meteorite, a  H chondrite crashes to Earth and lands in southwestern Michigan's Allegan County in the U.S.
 July 11 – In Turin in Italy, Giovanni Agnelli and eight investors form the Italian automobile manufacturer F.I.A.T. (Fabbrica Italiana Automobili Torino, the Italian Automobile Manufacturers of Turin), producers of the Fiat motor vehicles.
 July 12 – The British freight ship City of York sinks after striking reefs at Rottnest Island, off the coast of Western Australia, due to a misunderstanding of signal flare fired from the island's lighthouse.  The ship, which was nearing the end of a 90-day voyage from the U.S. (San Francisco) to Fremantle, Western Australia, evacuates its 26 crew in two lifeboats, but one of the boats overturns and 11 men, including Captain Phillip Jones, drown.
 July 13 – A tornado kills 13 people in the U.S. village of Herman, Nebraska.
 July 14 – The first Republic of Acre is declared by former Spanish journalist Luis Gálvez Rodríguez de Arias in the Amazon jungle in South America, and lasts for nine months. 
 July 15 – 
Japan's first comprhensive copyright law takes effect and, on the same day, Japan agrees to join the Berne Convention on respect of copyright laws of other nations. 
General Emilio Aguinaldo, who has commanded the Filipino resistance against the Spanish government, informs the U.S. Army General Thomas M. Anderson that he intends to assume authority for the Philippine Islands in areas conquered by the Filipinos from the Spaniards.
 July 16 – The first soccer football game in El Salvador between two organized teams takes place at the Campo Marte field in Santa Ana, where a local team hosts a team of players from San Salvador.  The Santa Ana team wins, 2 to 0.
 July 17
 NEC Corporation is organized as the first Japanese joint venture with foreign capital.
 In the Battle of Togbao, the French Bretonnet–Braun mission is destroyed, in the North African kingdom of Chad, by the warlord Rabih az-Zubayr.
 The Anglo-Japanese Treaty of Commerce and Navigation takes effect, ending extraterritoriality and the unequal status of Japan in foreign commerce.
 July 18 – The patent for the first sofa bed (a foldable bed frame that can be stored under the cushions of a couch) is taken out by African-American inventor Leonard C. Bailey.  He receives U.S. Patent No. 629,286 on June 2, 1900.
 July 19 – U.S. Secretary of War Russell A. Alger submits his resignation at the request of U.S. President McKinley, following public outrage over the United States Army beef scandal, in which the War Department purchased tainted beef for soldiers during the Spanish-American War.
 July 20 – A white lynch mob in Tallulah, Louisiana carries out the killing of five white Italian shopkeepers from Sicily who had opened stores in the town to sell produce and meat, after accusations that the Sicilians were driving the American stores out of business.  None of the suspects in the lynching are prosecuted.
 July 21 – The Newsboys' strike takes place, when the Newsies of New York go on strike (until August 2).
 July 22 – The torture and lynching of Frank Embree takes place in the town of Fayette, Missouri, after Embree, a black 19-year-old man, is accused by a mob of raping a white 14-year-old girl.  Shortly after Embree has received 100 lashes from a whip, a photographer takes Embree's photo, followed by another one after Embree's hanging.
 July 23 – The city of Washington DC retires its short-lived cable car system, the day after Columbia Railway Company converts exclusively to electric powered cars 
 July 24 – In the first trade treaty signed by the U.S. after the passage of the Dingley Act, which authorizes the U.S. President to negotiate reductions of tariffs up to 20% if the other side does the same, France and the United States sign an agreement for a 20% reduction of France's existing tariffs on 635 of 654 specific items, in return for the U.S. reduction between 5% and 20% of duty fees on 126 items.
 July 25 – France's Minister of War levies out punishments against officers who participated in the Dreyfus affair, removing General Georges-Gabriel de Pellieux from his duties as Military Governor of Paris, and removing General Oscar de Négrier from the War Council.
 July 26 – The President of the Dominican Republic, dictator Ulises Heureaux, is assassinated during a visit to the city of Moca.  Vice President Wenceslao Figuereo succeeds to the office.
 July 27 – Gold is discovered in Nome, Alaska, leading to the Nome Gold Rush. 
 July 28 – The All Cubans, a team of professional baseball players from Cuba, begins a barnstorming tour of games against white and black teams, starting with a 12-4 win over a local team at Weehawken, New Jersey
 July 29 – The first international Peace Conference ends, with the signing of the First Hague Convention.
 July 30 – The Harriman Alaska Expedition ends successfully.
 July 31 – Duke of York Island, outside Antarctica, is discovered by explorer Carsten Borchgrevink and the British Southern Cross Expedition.

August 1899 
 August 1 – A hurricane destroys all but nine homes in the small U.S. town of Carrabelle, Florida
 August 2 – The first attack on an offshore oil installation in the United States takes place off the coast of Santa Barbara, California near Montecito, when a mob of outraged citizens demolishes an oil rig.
 August 3 – The John Marshall Law School is founded in Chicago.
 August 4 – Japan rescinds its policy of extraterritoriality privileges to western nations that had operated consular courts to try cases against western nationals under western law. The British Court for Japan closes at the end of the year.
 August 5 – Automotive mechanic Henry Ford, with the help of 12 investors, incorporates the Detroit Automobile Company.  While the company will fail after 17 months, it establishes Detroit, Michigan, as the site for U.S. car manufacturing and the mistakes learned help Ford have more success with the Ford Motor Company.
 August 6 – Near Stratford, Connecticut, 36 people are killed when a trolley falls off of a trestle and lands upside down in a pond 40 feet below.  On the same day, the collapse of a ferry dock in Mount Desert Island, Maine, drowns 20-people.
 August 7 – 
The retrial of French Army Captain Alfred Dreyfus opens at Rennes.
Governance of the island of Guam, under the administration of the United States Department of the Navy, begins with Admiral Richard P. Leary as the first U.S. Naval Governor.
 August 8 – The San Ciriaco hurricane strikes Puerto Rico, recently annexed by the United States, and leaves 250,000 people homeless.  The official death toll is later listed as 3,369 people.
 August 9 – The Seats for Shop Assistants Act 1899 is given royal assent in the United Kingdom, providing, for the first time, a respite for workers required to remain standing for long periods of time.
 August 10 – Marshall "Major" Taylor wins the world  professional cycling championship in Montreal, securing his place as the first African American world champion in any sport.
 August 11 – The "Black Heavyweight Championship" of boxing is won by Frank Childs in a six-round win over Klondike Haynes.
 August 12 – South African Republic General Jan Smuts makes a final initiative to avert the outbreak of what will become the Second Boer War with Britain, meeting in Pretoria with the British charge d'affaires, Conyngham Greene.
 August 13 – The battle for the Philippine city of Angeles begins when the U.S. Army's VIII Corps, led by Major General Arthur MacArthur Jr., fights Philippine forces led by Brigadier General Maximino Hizon.  The U.S. captures the area, the future site of Clark Air Force Base, by August 16.
 August 14 – French attorney Fernand Labori is wounded in an assassination attempt while serving as the defense lawyer for in the retrial of Captain Alfred Dreyfus.
 August 15 – The Automobile Club of America, first automobile owners association in the U.S., is incorporated.
 August 16 – 
Hobson City, Alabama, the oldest exclusively African American municipality in the United States, is incorporated in Calhoun County with a population of 400 black residents. As of 2020, the town remains 92% African American.  At the time, only two other "all black" towns exist in the U.S., Lincolnville, South Carolina and Princeton, North Carolina.
Western outlaw Tom "Black Jack" Ketchum is badly wounded in a poorly-planned attempt to commit a train robbery by himself.  He is captured the next day, has an arm amputated, and is executed in a poorly-planned hanging in 1901.
 August 17 – 
Emperor Gojong of Korea issues the 9-article International Declaration declaring that, as "the great emperor of Korea", he has "infinite military authority" as well as absolute power to enact laws.
The San Ciriaco hurricane makes landfall in North Carolina's Outer Banks, completely destroying the town of Diamond City.
 August 18 – 
An explosion at a coal mine in Wales kills 25 miners.
Rasmus Midgett of the United States Life-Saving Service single-handedly saves the 10 surviving crew of the freighter SS Priscilla
 August 19 – A bill to construct the proposed Dortmund-Rhine Canal in Germany, supported by Kaiser Wilhelm II, failed overwhelmingly in the lower house of parliament, with 225 against and only 147 in favor.
 August 20 – The Kiram–Bates Treaty is signed in the Philippines by Jamalul Kiram II, Sultan of Sulu, and U.S. Army Brigadier General John C. Bates, with U.S. forces recognizing the autonomy of local governments in the Sulu Archipelago (within the Mindanao island group) in return for the Sultan's assistance in suppressing attacks on U.S. forces.
 August 21 – Sir Edmund Antrobus, owner of the land on Salisbury Plain upon which Stonehenge stands in England, offers to sell the land to the British government for £125,000. After Sir Edmund's death in 1915, his brother Cosmo will have the land auctioned for £6,600.
 August 22 – The earliest major motorcycle race in the U.S. takes place at the Harford Avenue Colosseum in Baltimore, Maryland, with three teams of motor-powered tandem bicycles competing.  The team of Henri Fournier and Charles Henshaw wins the race.
 August 23 – 
In Darien, Georgia, the "Delegal riot" takes place when hundreds of armed African-American residents surround the McIntosh County Jail to prevent the transfer of Henry Delegal, a black man charged with rape, to prevent the possibility of Delegal being lynched.  The Georgia State militia is sent in to disband the rioters (21 of whom are convicted of inciting a riot) and to oversee Delegal's safe transfer.  Delegal is later acquitted of the rape charge.
The first ship-to-shore test of a wireless radio transmission is made from the U.S. lightship LV 70 with the sending of Morse code signals to a receiving station near San Francisco.  The tests are made over 17 days with the ship also sending carrier pigeons to carry the message transmitted in order to verify the accuracy of the transmission.
 August 24 – France's Minister of Commerce, Alexandre Millerand, decrees a change in regulations to extend the right to workers' compensation to cover all profit-making establishments.
 August 25 – Two convicted murderers, Cyrus A. Brown and Matthew Craig, become the first white men to be legally executed in what is now the U.S. state of Oklahoma.  The two are hanged together at Muskogee in the Creek Nation section of the U.S. Indian Territory
 August 26 – The largest ship in the world, the White Star ocean liner RMS Oceanic, is delivered to Liverpool from the shipyards in Belfast, 11 days before its maiden voyage scheduled for September 6.
 August 27 – U.S. engineers, aided by local Sudanese workers, complete the installation of the prefabricated Atbara railroad bridge over the Nile River near Khartoum after outbidding British construction companies, marking a turning point in British leadership worldwide in construction. Lord Kitchener, commander of the British Army force in the Anglo-Egyptian Sudan, remarks at the ceremony, "... as Englishmen failed, I am delighted that our cousins across the Atlantic stepped in. This bridge is due to their energy, ability and power to turn out work of magnitude in less time than anybody else. I congratulate the Americans on their success in the erection of a bridge in the heart to Africa."
 August 28 – At least 512 people are killed when a debris hill from the Sumitomo Besshi copper mine at Niihama, Shikoku, Japan, collapses after heavy rain; 122 houses, a smelting factory, hospital and many other facilities are destroyed.
 August 29 – General Juan Isidro Jimenes, whose ship had stopped in Cuba while he was on his way to Santo Domingo to become the new President of the Dominican Republic, is arrested by order of U.S. Military Governor Leonard Wood after coming ashore at Santiago de Cuba. Jimenes would soon be released and would become the President on November 15, 1899. 
 August 30 – After taking over the second-largest city in the Dominican Republic, Santiago de los Caballeros, revolutionists proclaim Horacio Vásquez as the Central American nation's President in rebel-controlled territory.  At the same time in the capital at Santo Domingo, President Wenceslao Figuereo steps down after only five weeks in office and prepares to leave the city as the rebels approach.
 August 31 – The Olympique de Marseille association football club is founded in France.

September 1899 
 September 1 – The Nationaltheatret, Norway's national theater, is inaugurated 
 September 2 – In the Battle of Karari at Sudan between the British Army, led by Lord Kitchener, and Sudanese troops commanded by the Mahdi Khalifa Abdullah, 11,000 Sudanese are killed and 1,600 wounded.
 September 3 – An 8.2 magnitude earthquake shakes the area around Yakutat Bay in Alaska.
 September 4 – Thomas B. Reed, Speaker of the U.S. House of Representatives, resigns his seat in Congress and the Speaker's office in protest over U.S. President McKinley's support of war with Spain.
 September 5 – 
The first labor and management agreement in Denmark is reached between the Danish Federation of Trade Unions and the Danish Employers' Confederation.
General Horacio Vasquez, leader of a revolution against the Dominican Republic's President Wenceslao Figuereo, arrives at the capital, Santo Domingo and forms a provisional government. 
 September 6 – The White Star Line's transatlantic ocean liner  sails on her maiden voyage.
 September 7 – The first parade of automobiles in U.S. history takes place at Newport, Rhode Island.
 September 8 –  Eduardo Romana is inaugurated as the President of Peru.
 September 9 – In the retrial of his court-martial, French Army Captain Alfred Dreyfus is again found guilty of treason and sentenced to serve the remaining 10 years of his prison sentence on Devils Island.
 September 10 - A week after an 8.2 magnitude quake strikes Alaska, a stronger, 8.5 magnitude earthquake shakes Yakutat Bay.
 September 11 – Northern Arizona University is founded in Flagstaff in the Arizona Territory of the United States, as Northern Arizona Normal School, with 23 students and two professors.  More than a century later, the university has almost 30,000 students and 1,100 full time faculty.
 September 12 – American boxer Terry McGovern wins the world bantamweight title by knocking out British boxer Pedlar Palmer in the first round at the Westchester Athletic Club in New York.
 September 13 – 
Real estate agent Henry Bliss is struck by an electric-powered taxicab and fatally injured after stepping off of a trolley at the intersection of West 74th Street and Central Park West in New York City, becoming the first person in the U.S. to killed by an automobile.
The French Army invades the Sultanate of Zinder in Niger and kills the ruler, Amadou Kouran Daga.
 September 14 – General Cipriano Castro defeats the Venezuelan Army at the battle of Tocuyito and prepares to march to Caracas to overthrow President Ignacio Andrade.
 September 15 – Preparing for an attack on Britain's Cape Colony in South Africa from the neighboring Transvaal Republic, British Army Colonel Robert Baden-Powell arrives at the border town of Mafeking and begins recruiting volunteers and stockpiling munitions to prepare for an attack and siege.
 September 16 – In the second annual 1899 VFL Grand Final championship game of the Victorian Football League, defending champ Fitzroy narrowly retains the title over South Melbourne, 27 to 26.
 September 17 – The strange career of Australian bandit John Francis Peggotty, a diminutive holdup man said to have ridden on an ostrich, ends in the town of Meningie, South Australia when Peggotty's intended victim shoots both the bandit and the ostrich.  The body of the ostrich is found, but Peggotty is never seen again.
 September 18 – 
Rail transport is inaugurated in Korea with the opening of the Gyeongin Railway from Incheon (at the time called Chemulp'o) to Yeongdeungpo (a town located across the Han River from Seoul).
Scott Joplin's Maple Leaf Rag is registered for copyright, as ragtime music enjoys mainstream popularity in the United States.
 September 19 – 
Alfred Dreyfus is pardoned in France by the French Ministry of War.
The patent for the first water meter is granted to Edwin Ford, the water superintendent for Hartford City, Indiana.
 September 20 – Captain Alfred Dreyfus is released from prison at Rennes.
 September 21 – 
A special session of the Orange Free State's parliament, the Volksraad, meets at Bloemfontein in South Africa to discuss war with the British Empire. At the same time, three British transports depart from Bombay in India with troops to the Cape Colony in South Africa.
The Dominion Line steamer Scotsman sinks in the Strait of Belle Isle in Canada, killing 15 women and children. 
 September 22 – 
Elections are held in Sweden for the 230-seats of the Riksdag (formerly 182 seats).  The Lantmanna Party retains majority control.
Following a court-martial in Spain, Admiral Patricio Montojo, who had surrendered the Philippines to U.S. Admiral George Dewey to end the Spanish–American War, is relieved of all commands and placed on the reserve list.
 September 23 – Austria's Chancellor, Prince Franz von Thun, and his cabinet of ministers all resign.
 September 24 – A crowd of several thousand men in London disrupts an anti-war demonstration in Trafalgar Square and shouts down the Peace Association speakers as well as hurling "decayed apples and eggs and other missiles."
 September 25 – A Serbian court sentences 30 people convicted for conspiracy to attempt to assassinate the former King Milan, with the two main leaders being sentenced to death, and 10 others getting 20 year prison sentences.
 September 26 – General Manuel Guzman Alvarez of the Venezuelan state of Sucre joins with General Cipriano Castro in a revolt against the Venezuelan government.
 September 27 – Former U.S. President Benjamin Harrison concludes his special assignment of arguing in favor of Britain before the Anglo-Venezuelan arbitration tribunal.
 September 28 – 
Austrian auto designer Ferdinand Porsche attracts worldwide attention when his first car, the Porsche P1, wins the Berlin Road Race with such speed that he crosses the finish line 18 minutes ahead of the second-place finisher.
New Zealand's parliament approves a proposal to send troops to support Britain's Cape Colony in South Africa, while the Orange Free State parliament votes to support the South African Republic (the Transvaal), as war between the British and the Dutch appears imminent.
 September 29 – The Veterans of Foreign Wars (VFW) is founded in the U.S. by Spanish–American War veteran James C. Putnam as the American Veterans of Foreign Service.
 September 30 – 
A tsunami kills 3,864 people on Seram Island (now part of the Maluku province of Indonesia) after a 7.8 magnitude earthquake strikes at 1:42 in the morning local time.  According to a subsequent investigation, the villages of Paulohy-Samasuru and Mani, with a combined population of 2,400 people, are swept away by a  wave.
In Milwaukee, minor league baseball executive Harry Quinn announces an 8-team rival to baseball's 12-team National League, the "American Baseball Association" with an eastern division (New York, Philadelphia, Baltimore and Washington) and a western division (Chicago, St. Louis, Milwaukee and Detroit).

October 1899 
 October 1 – 
Possession of the Mariana Islands in the South Pacific Ocean is formally transferred from Spain to Germany, which purchased the archipelago (with the exception of Guam) from Spain for 837,500 German gold marks (equivalent in 1899 to $4,100,000), and become part of German New Guinea until the end of World War One.
Felipe Agoncillo, dispatched by the Philippine Revolutionary government to lobby for independence, meets in Washington with U.S. President McKinley and his attempt to be part of peace talks between the United States and Spain is rejected.
 October 2 – The Serbian government ends the state of siege in Belgrade that followed the attempted assassination of Serbia's former King Milan.
 October 3 – The boundary dispute between Venezuela and British Guiana (now Guyana) is resolved by a binding award from the International Tribunal of Arbitration of five neutral jurists agreed upon by the United Kingdom and the United Venezuelan States. 
 October 4 – The South African Republic issues an order to "all White inhabitants" within its protectorate, the Kingdom of Swaziland, to evacuate the area, with the exception of property owners eligible for active military service.  British subjects inside Swaziland are evicted and escorted to the border with the Portuguese East African colony of Mozambique
 October 5 – The 7,000 Zulu mineworkers in the Witwatersrand of the South African Republic are assembled by mine recruiter John Sidney Marwick at Johannesburg so that they can be transported home before war breaks out with Britain.
 October 6 – The War Office of the UK alerts the administrators of the 79,000-man British Army Reserve to prepare for drafting of soldiers in preparation for war in South Africa.
 October 7 – U.S. President William McKinley, Canada's Prime Minister Wilfrid Laurier and Mexico's Foreign Minister Ignacio Mariscal are hosted at the U.S. city of Chicago for its Autumn Festival.
 October 8 – The South African Republic (ZAR) telegraphs a three-day ultimatum to the U.K., demanding an arbitration of issues and a pullback of troops from the borders between the ZAR and the adjoining Cape Colony, Natal and Bechuanaland by October 11. 
 October 9 – The Hanover Congress of the Social Democratic Party of Germany begins in Hanover and lasts until October 14.
 October 10 – The French Sudan in west Africa is divided into two smaller administrative units, Middle Niger (which later becomes the nations of Niger and Gambia) and Upper Senegal (which becomes the nations of Senegal and Mali)
 October 11 – In South Africa, the Second Boer War between the United Kingdom and the Boers of the Transvaal and Orange Free State begins as the Boers invade the British colony of Natal.
 October 12 – The Sultan of Turkey issues a decree promising reforms to the persecution of Armenians in the Ottoman Empire.
 October 13 – The Second Boer War extends into the British Bechuanaland Protectorate (now Botswana as the siege of Mafeking begins.
 October 14 – The Boer invasion of the Cape Colony begins with the siege of Kimberley.
 October 15 – French Army officer Ferdinand de Béhagle is put to death by Sudanese warlord Rabih az-Zubayr, prompting a French expedition to be led against Rabih.
 October 16 – A Chinese Honeymoon, the first musical to run for more than 1,000 performances, is performed for the first time, making its debut at the Theatre Royal in Hanley, Staffordshire before moving to London.
 October 17 – The Thousand Days' War (La Guerra de los Mil Días) begins in the South American nation in Colombia as Colombian Liberal Party soldiers led by General Rafael Uribe Uribe, with the support of aid from Venezuela, begin a fight against the government of National Party president Manuel Antonio Sanclemente.  The war will continue for 1,130 days until November 21, 1902.
 October 18 – The Boxer Rebellion begins in China as the Battle of Senluo Temple is fought in China's Shandong province between more than 4,000 Imperial Chinese Army troops and at least 1,000 rebels from the Society of Righteous and Harmonious Fists.
 October 19 – 
In Worcester, Massachusetts, 17-year-old Robert H. Goddard receives his inspiration to develop the first rocket capable of reaching outer space, after viewing his yard from high in a tree and imagining "how wonderful it would be to make some device which had even the possibility of ascending to Mars, and how it would look on a small scale, if sent up from the meadow at my feet."
Boer troops commanded by Johannes Kock capture the railway station in the British Natal colony town of Elandslaagte and cut the telegraph line between the British Army headquarters at Ladysmith and the British station at Dundee.
 October 20 – In the first major clash of the Second Boer War, the Battle of Talana Hill (near Dundee, Natal), the British Army drives the Boers from a hilltop position, but with heavy casualties, including their commanding general Sir Penn Symons.
 October 21 – The Battle of Elandslaagte is fought in Britain's Natal colony as the British Army recaptures the railway station from Boers, then proceeds toward the fortress of Ladysmith.  South African General Jan Kock is fatally wounded in the battle and dies 10 later while imprisoned at Ladysmith.
 October 22 – In Spain, an advertisement runs in the sports magazine Los Deportes, paid for by Swiss immigrant Hans Gamper, announces that Gamper is seeking to create a soccer football team for Barcelona. The organizational meeting takes place at the Sociedad Los Deportes on November 29, attracting 11 players who form Futbol Club Barcelona.
 October 23 – 
The Philippine Independent Church is formed at a conference in Paniqui for the purpose of separating from the Roman Catholic Church.
The Empire of Austria holds its first automobile race.  It is won in Vienna by Baron Theodor von Liebig, driving an NW Rennzweier car.
 October 24 – 
The sinking of the ship Cisneros by the Colombian Navy warship Hércules drowns more than 200 Liberal rebels during the Battle of Magdalena River in northern Colombia.
President Steyn of the South African Republic proclaims the annexation of the northern portion of the Cape Colony above the Vaal River.
 October 25 – 
José Manuel Pando, a member of the three-member junta that has governed Bolivia since April 12, becomes the new president.
Elisara Alaalamua is installed as the new Tui Manuʻa or Paramount Chief of the Samoan island of Taʻū.
 October 26 – 
Indirect fire, a shooting technique based on calculating azimuth and inclination to aim a weapon at an enemy that cannot be hit by direct fire, is used for the first time in battle. British gunners in the Second Boer War, using the techniques developed by Russian Lieutenant Colonel K. G. Guk, fire a cannon on a high trajectory toward the Boer Army, with the objective of having the shell coming down on the enemy.
Voting takes place in Switzerland for the 147-member National Council.
The foundering of the British steamer Zurich off of the coast of Norway kills 16 of the 17 crew aboard, with only the captain surviving.
 October 27 – Louise Masset, an unmarried mother, murders her 3-year old son in a bathroom at the Dalston Junction railway station in London. She will be found guilty on December 18 and hanged at Newgate Prison three weeks later on January 9.
 October 28 – The Swaziland Commando unit of the South African Republic Army, with 200 burghers, attacks and burns the British police post at Kwaliweni during the Second Boer War.  Warned by Swaziland's King Ngwane V, the 20 policemen are able to evacuate the post office and flee to Ingwavuma, which the Commandos attack next.
 October 29 – The Battle of Kouno ends after two days in French Equatorial Africa at the village of Kouno, near Fort-Archambault in what is now Chad, as French Army Captain Émile Gentil leads a force of 344 troops against a much larger force of 2,700 Sudanese Arabs, led by the warlord Rabih az-Zubayr.  Gentil routs the Sudanese, but at the cost of 46 deaths and more than 100 wounded.
 October 30 – In a key engagement in the Second Boer War, the Battle of Ladysmith begins as British troops at the Ladysmith fort in the colony of Natal attempt to make a preemptive strike against a larger force of South African Republic and Orange Free State troops that is gradually surrounding the fort.  After sustaining 400 casualties and having 800 men captured, the British retreat back to the fort where a 118-day siege begins on November 2.
 October 31 – The House of Commons of the United Kingdom unveils the statue of Oliver Cromwell, commissioned in honor of the former Lord Protector of the Commonwealth of England, Scotland and Ireland.

November 1899 
 November 1 – A spokesman for the White House announces that U.S. Vice President Garret Hobart will not return to public life  and reveals that Hobart has serious health problems.  Hobart had retired to his home in Paterson, New Jersey, shortly after having been assigned the duty of telling War Secretary Russell Alger to resign. On November 21, Hobart becomes the fourth U.S. Vice President to die in office. 
 November 2 – The siege of Ladysmith begins in Britain's Natal colony in South Africa, as armies of the two Boer republics (the South African Republic and the Orange Free State) cut telegraph lines connecting Ladysmith to the British colony, and try over the next 118 days to starve out the British force.  The British defenders will hold the fort without surrendering, despite disease and starvation, until the siege is broken on February 28, 1900 by a force led by British Army General Redvers Buller.
 November 3 – The first championship boxing bout to be filmed for motion pictures is fought between challenger Tom Sharkey and heavyweight champion James J. Jeffries.  Jeffries wins in 25 rounds at an indoor arena at Coney Island, New York, with American Mutoscope and Biograph filming the action.
 November 4 – The Alpha Sigma Tau sorority, which has chapters at 83 colleges and universities in the U.S. as of 2022, is founded in Ypsilanti, Michigan.
 November 5 – 
The U.S. Army, commanded by Major General Arthur MacArthur, wins the battle to capture the Philippine Republic's capital at Angeles City, after nearly three months of fighting that began on August 10. It also captures the Philippine stronghold of Magalang, which had been defended by Major General Servillano Aquino. 
The Belgian Antarctic Expedition, led by Adrien de Gerlache, is concluded as RV Belgica sails into Antwerp harbor.
 November 6 – 
The first Packard luxury automobile is produced at company's plant in Warren, Ohio.
The first Broadway play based on Arthur Conan Doyle's detective Sherlock Holmes debuts at the Garrick Theater as a production of William Gillette.
The Boers begin the shelling of the British settlement at Mafeking.
 November 7 – 
The flash-lamp, the first to use electricity to ignite photographers' magnesium flash powder, is awarded as U.S. patent 636,492 to Joshua Lionel Cohen. While flash powder had been in use since 1887, the ignition was more dangerous because it had to be performed manually.
Representatives of the U.S., the UK and Germany sign a treaty in Washington for arbitration of Samoa's claims for damages, with King Oscar of Sweden and Norway agreeing to become the neutral arbitrator.
 November 8 – The New York Zoological Society opens the Bronx Zoological Park to the public, in New York City.
 November 9 – 
The first British transport of supplemental troops arrives at Cape Town to enter the Second Boer War against the South African Republic. 
The Boer attack on Ladysmith is repulsed by the British artillery, with the Boers sustaining 800 killed and wounded.
 November 10 – At the age of 20, Sir Ranbir Singh is invested with full ruling powers over the princely state of Jind in British India, after having ascended the throne as Maharaja of Jind on March 7, 1877, at the age of 8.
 November 11 – The Battle of San Jacinto is fought in the Philippines, with the U.S. 33rd Volunteer Infantry forcing Philippine Army General Manuel Tinio's troops to retreat. The battle demonstrates the limitations to the heavy, wheel-mounted Gatling gun, in uneven territory.
 November 12 – 
Philippine Federation President Emilio Aguinaldo abolishes the federal government system in the Philippines as the U.S. Army makes further incursions into Filipino-controlled territory, and moves his capital to Bayambang. 
The city of Puerto Cabello in Venezuela surrenders to General Cipriano Castro after heavy fighting.
 November 13 – 
Philippine President Aguinaldo dissolves the remains of the Filipino regular army and moves to a strategy of guerrilla warfare against the U.S. occupational forces.
China's Hunan province opens to foreign trade for the first time.
In Colombia's Thousand Days' War, the Battle of Bucaramanga ends with a victory over the Colombian Army against an attack by Liberal Party rebels, who suffer 1,000 killed and 500 wounded.
 November 14 – The first aerial crossing of the Mediterranean Sea is made by Louis Capazza and Alphonse Fondère in Capazza's balloon Gabizos. The group departs Marseilles in France at 4:30 in the morning and arrives at 11:00 a.m. on the island of Corsica. 
 November 16 – A British Army train carrying troops is wrecked in South Africa near Estcourt by the Boers, and 56 men are taken prisoner, including war correspondent Winston Churchill.
With construction and dredging over the next 12 years, the strategic base is later named for its location on Pearl Harbor.
 November 18 – On the final game of its season, the Harvard University college football team, having a record of 10 wins (nine by shutout) and no defeats, hosts its rival, Yale University (7-1-0), and plays to a scoreless tie before 35,000 fans.  Although Harvard's 1899 streak of defeating every opponent is ended by the tie, the Crimson team will later be selected retroactively (and recognized by the NCAA Record Book) as the 1899 mythical national champion by the Helms Athletic Foundation.
 November 19 – In the Second Boer War, the Boers redeploy 4,000 of the 8,000 troops assigned to the Siege of Mafeking, because of the heavy resistance by the British defenders.
 November 20 – 
Aston Villa F.C. and the Orange Free State national soccer football team play a friendly match despite the ongoing Second Boer War between the United Kingdom and the Orange Free State.  The Orange Free State had been touring Britain at the time that the War broke out. Aston Villa wins, 7 to 4.
Germany's Kaiser Wilhelm II and his family arrive in London at the invitation of Queen Victoria's government, and are greeted by cheering crowds.
British Lieutenant-General John French arrives at the Colesberg in the Cape Colony front to coordinate the defense of the British colonies in South Africa against the Boer attack and conducts a series of distracting maneuvers that succeed in preventing the South African Republic from attempting an invasion of the Cape Colony. 
 November 21 – The Boers cut off all telegraph lines and seized the railway connecting Estcourt to the rest of the Cape Colony.
 November 22 – American serial killer Martin Stickles kills his first random victim, shooting a former neighbor, William B. Shanklin, then burning down Shanklin's house.
 November 23 – The U.S. Department of the Post Office applied the same charges for mail from Puerto Rico, the Philippines and Guam as were used in the other 46 U.S. states.
 November 24 – Eleonora de Cisneros, the first American-trained opera singer in the U.S., makes her debut for the Metropolitan Opera company, appearing as Rossweisse at the Met's production of Wagner's Die Walküre in Chicago.
 November 25 – The Battle of Umm Diwaykarat, a decisive British and Egyptian victory ends the Mahdist War in the Sudan, as the Khalifa of Sudan, Abdallahi ibn Muhammad, is killed.  The Sudanese sustain 1,000 casualties, while the Anglo-Egyptian force commanded by General Reginald Wingate has three killed and 23 wounded.  
 November 26 – Elections are held in the Kingdom of Portugal for the 138 seats of the Câmara dos Senhores Deputados. Prime Minister José Luciano de Castro's Partido Progressista increases its majority, winning 91 of the seats.
 November 27 – The Ottoman Empire grants Germany's Deutsche Bank the concession to finance the construction of the Baghdad Railway, following a visit by Kaiser Wilhelm II to Constantinople in 1898 as a guest of Sultan Abdul Hamid II.
 November 28 – 
The British Army sustains heavy losses (471 casualties) in the Battle of Modder River, which Lord Methuen describes as "one of the hardest and most trying fights in the annals of the British Army", despite routing the Boers.
The Philippine Republic capital at Bayambang surrenders as the government flees the Fourth Cavalry of the U.S. Army.
 November 29 – The FC Barcelona association football (soccer) club is founded in Spain.
 November 30 – 
The first women to serve, in uniform, in the armed forces of any nation began service as part of the Canadian Militia Expeditionary Force to Cape Town to serve in the Boer War.  Georgina Fane Pope and three other women are enlisted as army nurses.  As Patrick Robertson notes, "There was nothing new about female nurses serving in the military; they had done so in numerous campaigns since the Revolutionary War, but in every instance as civilian auxiliaries."
The British Secretary of State for the Colonies, Joseph Chamberlain, makes a controversial public speech at Leicester proposing ""a new Triple Alliance between the Teutonic race and the two great trans-Atlantic branches of the Anglo-Saxon race which would become a potent influence on the future of the world," with the United Kingdom, the United States and Germany agreeing to work together.

December 1899 
 December 2
 Philippine–American War – Battle of Tirad Pass ("The Filipino Thermopylae"): General Gregorio del Pilar and his troops are able to guard the retreat of Philippine President Emilio Aguinaldo, before being wiped out.
 During the new moon, a near-grand conjunction of the classical planets and several binocular Solar System bodies occur. The Sun, Moon, Mercury, Mars and Saturn are all within 15° of each other, with Venus 5° ahead of this conjunction and Jupiter 15° behind. Accompanying the classical planets in this grand conjunction are Uranus (technically visible unaided in pollution-free skies), Ceres and Pallas.
 Rebel Venezuelan General Jose Manuel Hernandez captures the city of Maracaibo in his revolt against Cipriano Castro's government, but is only able to hold it for 15 days.
 December 4 – As the 56th U.S. Congress holds its first session, David B. Henderson (Republican-Iowa) is elected Speaker of the House. The House refuses permission for Brigham H. Roberts (Democrat-Utah) to take the oath of office as a U.S. Representative, pending investigation of allegations of bigamy.
 December 5 – Germany's cabinet agrees to repeal a Prussian law that had prohibited the creation of political societies or clubs.
 December 6 – A lynch mob in Maysville, Kentucky forces its way into the county jail to seize an African-American indicted for murder, tortures him and then burns him to death.
 December 9 – An explosion kills 32 coal miners at the Carbon Hill mines in Carbonado, Washington.
 December 10 
 Four-month-old Sobhuza II begins his 82-year reign as King of Swaziland, on the death of his father, Ngwane V; his grandmother Labotsibeni Mdluli serves as queen regent.
 Battle of Stormberg: The British Army makes a disastrous attempt to surprise the Boer position in Natal and suffers the loss of 687 officers and men.
 The college fraternity Delta Sigma Phi is founded at the City College of New York, by Charles A. Tonsor Jr. and Meyer Boskey.
 December 11 – 
Second Boer War – Battle of Magersfontein: Boers defeat British forces trying to relieve the Siege of Kimberley.
Philippine-American War: Filipino General Tierona surrenders the province of Cagayan to U.S. Navy Captain McCalla of the USS Newark.
 December 13 – General French routs Boer troops that had been advancing into the Cape Colony toward Noupoort.
 December 14 – Walther Hauser is elected President of Switzerland by the Swiss Federal Assembly.
 December 15 – 
Battle of Colenso: Britain's General Buller loses 1,097 officers and men in a fight against the Boers in Natal, the third serious British reverse in South Africa in a week.
Glasgow School of Art opens its new building, the most notable work of Scottish architect Charles Rennie Mackintosh.
The Republican National Committee votes to hold its 1900 national convention in Philadelphia, to start on June 19, 1900.
 December 16 – The Association football club A.C. Milan is founded in Italy.
 December 18 – 
The British War Office sends Lord Roberts to South Africa to become the new commander of British forces in the Second Boer War, with Lord Kitchener to be second in command, and announces that 100,000 additional men will be sent.
U.S. Army General Lawton is killed by a Filipino sniper near San Mateo on Luzon island.
Stock prices fall drastically at the New York exchanges and the Produce Exchange Trust Company fails.
 December 19 – New York City's clearinghouse banks pool together a $10,000,000 loan fund to prevent further failures of companies. 
 December 20 – The U.S. government arrests nine customs officials in Havana on charges of collusion to defraud the government.
 December 21 – U.S. Army General Leonard Wood arrives in Havana to become the new Governor-General of Cuba.
 December 22 – 
 More than 40 schoolchildren from Belgium drown in the capsizing of a boat near the French town of Frelinghien on the River Lys that serves a boundary between Belgium and France.
 A fire kills 16 children in Quincy, Illinois.
 December 23 – 
Forty coal miners are killed in an explosion near Brownsville, Pennsylvania.
Sir Reginald Wingate is appointed as the new British Governor-General of Anglo-Egyptian Sudan.
 December 24 – The wreck of the British steamship Ariosto off the coast of Hatteras, North Carolina in the U.S. drowns 21 of the crew.
 December 26 – Pinnacle Rock, a balancing rock in Cumberland Gap on the Tennessee and Kentucky border in the U.S., falls down.
 December 28 – The bodies of the officers and men killed on the 1898 explosion of the battleship USS Maine  are reinterred at the Arlington National Cemetery.
 December 29 – The British Royal Navy cruiser HMS Magicienne seizes the German steamer, Bundesroth in Delagoa Bay at Portuguese East Africa (now Mozambique) on grounds that German officers and men are being brought to supplement the Boer Army. The Bundesroth is then escorted to Durban in Britain's Natal Colony.
 December 30 – General Wood completes the appointment of a cabinet of ministers composed of Cuban residents, with Diego Tamayo, Luis Esterez, Juan B. Hernandez, Enrique Varona, Jose R. Villaton and Ruiz Rivera taking office.
 December 31
 The last day of the 1890s takes place, and the German government and Kaiser Wilhelm II declare that the 20th century will begin on January 1, 1900. In most of the world, however, December 31, 1899 is not the last day of the 19th century, which also includes the year 1900.
 December 31, 1899 is day zero for dates in Microsoft Excel, similar to January 1, 1970 being day zero for Unix time. This is to ensure backwards compatibility with Lotus 1-2-3, which had a bug misinterpreting 1900 as a leap year.

Date unknown 

 Ferdinand Zeppelin builds the first successful airship.
 The significance of Chinese oracle bones is discovered.
 The North Carolina General Assembly incorporates the town of Manteo, which was originally laid out as the Dare County seat in 1870.
 Riro, last of the Kings of Easter Island, on a visit to Valparaíso, Chile, dies either from alcohol poisoning, or an assassination plot by the Chilean government.
 Oxo beef stock cubes are introduced, by Liebig's Extract of Meat Company.
 Alfred R. Tucker becomes Bishop of Uganda.
 The German company Miele is founded.
 Torii Shoten, predecessor of Suntory, a worldwide alcoholic drink and soft drink brand, was founded in Osaka, Japan.
 Giros-Loucheur Group, predecessor of Vinci, a worldwide construction and infrastructure industry, founded in France.
 Timken Roller Bearing Company, predecessor of worldwide parts brand, Timken was founded in Missouri, United States.
The 1899–1923 cholera pandemic occur in the Europe, Asia and Africa (Old World), right behind the 1846–1860 cholera pandemic in Russia

Births

January 

 January 1 – Jack Beresford, British Olympic rower (d. 1977)
 January 3 – Karl Diebitsch, German fashion designer (1985)
 January 6 
 Alphonse Castex, French rugby union player (d. 1969)
 Heinrich Nordhoff, German automotive engineer (d. 1968)
 Elsie Steele, British supercentenarian (d. 2010)
 January 7 – Francis Poulenc, French composer (d. 1963)
 January 8 – S. W. R. D. Bandaranaike, 4th Prime Minister of Sri Lanka (d. 1959)
 January 11 – Eva Le Gallienne, English actress (d. 1991)
 January 12 – Paul Hermann Müller, Swiss chemist, recipient of the Nobel Prize in Physiology or Medicine (d. 1965)
 January 14
 Fritz Bayerlein, German general (d. 1970)
 Carlos Romulo, Filipino diplomat (d. 1985)
 January 15 – Goodman Ace, American actor, comedian and writer (d. 1982)
 January 17
 Al Capone, American gangster (d. 1947)
 Nevil Shute, English-born novelist (d. 1960)
 January 20 – Kenjiro Takayanagi, Japanese television development pioneer (d. 1990)
 January 21
 Gyula Mándi, Hungarian footballer and manager (d. 1969)
 John Bodkin Adams, British physician acquitted of murder (d. 1983)
 January 23 – Tom Denning, Baron Denning, English lawyer, judge and Master of the Rolls (d. 1999)
 January 25 – Paul-Henri Spaak, 31st Prime Minister of Belgium and international statesman (d. 1972)
 January 27 – Béla Guttmann, Hungarian-born Association football coach (d. 1981)
 January 29 – Antal Páger, Hungarian actor (d. 1986)
 January 30 – Max Theiler, South African virologist, recipient of the Nobel Prize in Physiology or Medicine (d. 1972)

February 

 February 2 – Herbie Faye, American actor (d. 1980)
 February 3
 Café Filho, 18th President of Brazil (d. 1970)
 Lao She, Chinese author (d. 1966)
 Doris Speed, British actress (d. 1994)
 Mildred Trotter, American forensic anthropologist (d. 1991)
 February 4 – Virginia M. Alexander, African-American physician (d. 1949)
 February 6 – Ramon Novarro,  Mexican-born American actor (d. 1968)
 February 7 – Earl Whitehill, American baseball player (d. 1954)
 February 10 – Cevdet Sunay, 5th President of Turkey (d. 1982)
 February 15
 Georges Auric, French composer (d. 1983)
 Lillian Disney, American artist (d. 1997)
 Gale Sondergaard, American actress (d. 1985)
 February 17 
 Jibanananda Das, Indian poet, writer, novelist and essayist in Bengali (d. 1954)
 Leo Najo, American baseball player (d. 1978)
 February 18 – Sir Arthur Bryant, British historian (d. 1985)
 February 19 – Ehrenfried Pfeiffer, German scientist (d. 1961)
 February 22
 Joseph Le Brix, French aviator, naval officer (d. 1931)
 Margarito Flores García, Mexican Roman Catholic priest, martyr and saint (d. 1927)
 George O'Hara, American actor (d. 1966)
 Ian Clunies Ross, Australian scientist (d. 1959)
 Dechko Uzunov, Bulgarian painter (d. 1986)
 February 23 – Erich Kästner, German writer (d. 1974)
 February 24 – Mikhail Gromov, Soviet aviator (d. 1985)
 February 26
 Alec Campbell, Australian WWI soldier, last Australian Gallipoli veteran (d. 2002)
 Max Petitpierre, member of the Swiss Federal Council (d. 1994)
 February 27 – Charles Best, Canadian medical scientist (d. 1978)

March 

 March 4 – Harry R. Wellman, University of California president (d. 1997)
 March 8
 Eric Linklater, American author (d. 1974)
 Elmer Keith, American rancher, author, and firearms enthusiast (d. 1984)
 March 11 – King Frederick IX of Denmark (d. 1972)
 March 13 – John Hasbrouck Van Vleck, American physicist, Nobel Prize laureate (d. 1980)
 March 18 – Jean Goldkette, French-born musician (d. 1962)
 March 21 – Panagiotis Pipinelis, Prime Minister of Greece (d. 1970)
 March 24 – Dorothy C. Stratton, American director of the SPARS during World War II (d. 2006)
 March 25 - Burt Munro, New Zealand motorcycle racer (d. 1978)
March 27 – Gloria Swanson, American actress (d. 1983)
 March 28 
 August Anheuser Busch Jr., American founder of the Anheuser-Busch Brewery Company (d. 1989)
 Harold B. Lee, 11th president of the Church of Jesus Christ of Latter-day Saints (d. 1973)
 March 29 
James V. Allred, American politician, 33rd Governor of Texas (d. 1959)
Lavrentiy Beria, Soviet official (d. 1953)

April 

 April 1 – Gustavs Celmiņš, Latvian fascist leader (d. 1968)
 April 3 – Maria Redaelli-Granoli, Italian supercentenarian, oldest person in Europe (d. 2013)
 April 4 – Hillel Oppenheimer, German-born Israeli botanist (d. 1971)
 April 5
Nicolae Cambrea, Romanian general (d. 1976) 
Elsie Thompson, American supercentenarian (d. 2013) 
 April 7 – Robert Casadesus, French pianist (d. 1972)
 April 9 – Hans Jeschonnek, German general (d. 1943)
 April 16 – Osman Achmatowicz, Polish chemist (d. 1988)
 April 19 – George O'Brien, American actor (d. 1985)
 April 20 – Alan Arnett McLeod, Canadian soldier (d. 1918)
 April 21 – Percy Lavon Julian, American scientist (d. 1975)
 April 22 – Vladimir Nabokov, Russian-born American writer (d. 1977)
 April 23 – Bertil Ohlin, Swedish economist, Nobel Prize laureate (d. 1979)
 April 24 – Oscar Zariski, Russian mathematician (d. 1986)
 April 26 – John Fearns Nicoll, British colonial governor (d. 1981)
 April 27 – Walter Lantz, American animator, creator of Woody Woodpecker (d. 1994)
 April 29
 Duke Ellington, African-American jazz musician, bandleader (d. 1974)
 Mary Petty, American illustrator (d. 1976)

May 

 May 3 – Aline MacMahon, American actress (d. 1991)
 May 6 – Billy Cotton, British entertainer, bandleader (d. 1969)
 May 8
 Arthur Q. Bryan, American actor, voice actor, comedian and radio personality (d. 1959)
 Friedrich Hayek, Austrian economist, Nobel Prize laureate (d. 1992)
 May 10 – Fred Astaire, American singer, dancer, and actor (d. 1987)
 May 12 – Indra Devi, Baltic-born yogi, and actress (d. 2002)
 May 15 – Jean-Étienne Valluy, French general (d. 1970)
 May 17 – Carmen de Icaza, Spanish writer (d. 1979)
 May 18 – Ronald Armstrong-Jones, Welsh barrister (d. 1966)
 May 20 – John Marshall Harlan II, Associate Justice of the Supreme Court of the United States (d. 1971)
 May 23 – Jeralean Talley, American supercentenarian (d. 2015)
 May 24 
 Suzanne Lenglen, French tennis player (d. 1938)
 Kazi Nazrul Islam, Bangladeshi national poet (d. 1976)
 May 26 – Ruth Bird, English historian and schoolteacher. (d. 1987)
 May 30 – Irving Thalberg, American film producer (d. 1936)

June 

 June 1 – Edward Charles Titchmarsh, British mathematician (d. 1963)
 June 2 – Lotte Reiniger, German-born silhouette animator (d. 1981)
 June 3 – Georg von Békésy, Hungarian biophysicist, recipient of the Nobel Prize in Physiology or Medicine (d. 1972)
 June 4 – Arthur Barker, American criminal, son of Ma Barker (d. 1939)
 June 9 – Signe Amundsen, Norwegian operatic soprano (d. 1987)
 June 10 – Ruth Poll, American lyricist and music publisher (d. 1955)
 June 11 – Yasunari Kawabata, Japanese writer, recipient of the Nobel Prize in Literature (d. 1972)
 June 12 – Fritz Albert Lipmann, American biochemist, recipient of the Nobel Prize in Physiology or Medicine (d. 1986)
 June 13 – Carlos Chávez, Mexican composer (d. 1978)
 June 16 – Helen Traubel, American soprano (d. 1972)
 June 18 – John Warburton, British actor (d. 1981)
 June 24 – Bruce Marshall, Scottish writer (d. 1987)
 June 25 – Arthur Tracy, American singer (d. 1997)
 June 26 
 Odus Mitchell, American football player and coach (d. 1989)
 Grand Duchess Maria Nikolaevna of Russia (d. 1918)
 June 27 – Juan Trippe, American airline pioneer, entrepreneur (d. 1981)
 June 29 – Edward Twining, British diplomat, Governor of North Borneo and of Tanganyika (d. 1967)
 June 30 
 Madge Bellamy, American actress (d. 1990)
 Harry Shields, American jazz clarinettist (d. 1971)

July 

 July 1 
 Thomas A. Dorsey, American musician (d. 1993)
 Charles Laughton, English-American stage, film actor (d. 1962)
 Konstantinos Tsatsos, President of Greece (d. 1987)
 July 4 – Austin Warren, American literary critic, author, and professor of English (d. 1986)
 July 5 – Marcel Achard, French playwright, scriptwriter (d. 1974)
 July 6 – Susannah Mushatt Jones, American supercentenarian, Last remaining American born in the 19th century (d. 2016)
 July 7
 George Cukor, American film director (d. 1983)
 Jesse Wallace, American naval officer, 29th Governor of American Samoa (d. 1961)
 July 10 – John Gilbert, American actor (d. 1936)
 July 11
E. B. White, American writer (d. 1985)
Frank R. Walker, American admiral (d. 1976)
 July 12 – E. D. Nixon, African-American civil rights leader and union organizer (d. 1987)
 July 15 – Seán Lemass, Taoiseach of Ireland (d. 1971)
 July 16 – Božidar Jakac, Slovene Expressionist, Realist and Symbolist painter, printmaker, art teacher, photographer and filmmaker (d. 1989)
 July 17 – James Cagney, American actor and dancer (d. 1986)
 July 18 – Floyd Stahl, American collegiate athletic coach (d. 1996)
 July 20 – Paul Christoph Mangelsdorf, American botanist and agronomist (d. 1989)
 July 21
 Hart Crane, American poet (suicide 1932)
 Ernest Hemingway, American author, journalist (suicide 1961)
 July 22 – King Sobhuza II of Swaziland (d. 1982)
 July 23 – Gustav Heinemann, President of West Germany (d. 1976)
 July 24 – Chief Dan George, Canadian actor, writer and tribal chief of the Tsleil-Waututh First Nation (d. 1981)
 July 29
 Walter Beall, American baseball player (d. 1959)
 Alice Terry, American film actress (d. 1987)

August 

 August 1 – Kamala Nehru, Spouse of Prime Minister of India (d. 1936)
 August 4 – Ezra Taft Benson, 13th president of the Church of Jesus Christ of Latter-day Saints (d. 1994)
 August 9 
 Paul Kelly, American stage, film actor (d. 1956)
 P. L. Travers, Australian-born British actress, journalist and author (d. 1996)
 August 13 – Alfred Hitchcock, British-born American film director (d. 1980)
 August 14 – Alma Reville, English screenwriter and film editor, wife of director Alfred Hitchcock (d. 1982)
 August 16 – Glenn Strange, American actor (d. 1973)
 August 17 – Janet Lewis, American novelist and poet (d. 1998)
 August 19 – Colleen Moore, American actress (d. 1988)
 August 24
 Jorge Luis Borges, Argentine writer (d. 1986)
 Albert Claude, Belgian biologist, recipient of the Nobel Prize in Physiology or Medicine (d. 1983)
 August 26 – Rufino Tamayo, Mexican painter (d. 1991)
 August 27
 C. S. Forester, English novelist (d. 1966)
 Byron Foulger, American actor (d. 1970)
 August 28 
 Charles Boyer, French actor (d. 1978)
 Béla Guttmann, Hungarian footballer and coach (d. 1981) 
 Vernon Huber, American rear admiral; 36th Governor of American Samoa (d. 1967)
 August 29 – Lyman Lemnitzer, American general (d. 1988)
 August 30 – Ray Arcel, American boxing trainer (d. 1994)
 August 31 – Boots Adams, American business magnate, president of Phillips Petroleum Company (d. 1975)

September 

 September 1
Andrei Platonovich Klimentov, Russian-born Soviet writer (d. 1951)
Takuma Nishimura, Japanese general (d. 1951)
 September 3 – Macfarlane Burnet, Australian biologist, recipient of the Nobel Prize in Physiology or Medicine (d. 1985)
 September 8 – May McAvoy, American actress and singer (d. 1984)
 September 9
 Brassaï, French photographer (d. 1984)
 Waite Hoyt, American baseball player (d. 1984)
 September 11 – Jimmie Davis, American politician and musician, Governor of Louisiana (d. 2000)
 September 13 – Corneliu Zelea Codreanu, Romanian fascist politician, leader of the Iron Guard (d. 1938)
 September 17 – Harold Bennett, British actor (d. 1981)
 September 18 – Ida Kamińska, Polish-Jewish actress, playwright, and translator (d. 1980)
 September 21 – Frederick Coutts, 8th General of The Salvation Army (d. 1986)
 September 23 – Tom C. Clark, Associate Justice of the Supreme Court of the United States (d. 1977)
 September 24 – Bessie Braddock, British politician (d. 1970)

October 

 October 1 – Ernest Haycox, American writer (d. 1950)
 October 3 – Gertrude Berg, American actress (d. 1966)
 October 4 
 Franz Jonas, President of Austria (d. 1974)
 Trinidad Roxas, 5th First Lady of the Philippines (d. 1995)
 October 5 – George, Duke of Mecklenburg, head of the House of Mecklenburg-Strelitz (d. 1963)
 October 9 – Bruce Catton, American Civil War historian, Pulitzer Prize winner (1954) (d. 1978)
 October 19 – Miguel Ángel Asturias, Guatemalan writer, Nobel Prize laureate (d. 1974)
 October 20 – Evelyn Brent, American actress (d. 1975)
 October 22 – Nikolay Bogolyubov, Soviet and Russian actor (d. 1980)
 October 24
 Burr Shafer, American cartoonist (d. 1965)
 László Bíró, Hungarian inventor of the ballpoint pen (d. 1985)
 October 29 – Akim Tamiroff, Armenian actor (d. 1972)
 October 30 – Katarina Marinič, Slovenian supercentenarian (d. 2010)

November 

 November 5 – Forrest Lewis, American actor (d. 1977)
 November 6 – Feng Zhanhai, Chinese military leader, government official (d. 1963)
 November 7
 Yitzhak Lamdan, Russian-born Israeli poet, columnist (d. 1954)
 Stanisław Swianiewicz, Polish economist and historian (d. 1997)
 November 11 – Pat O'Brien, American actor (d. 1983)
 November 13
 Vera Caspary, American screenwriter, novelist, playwright (d. 1987)
 Iskander Mirza, 1st president of Pakistan (d. 1969)
 November 15 – Avdy Andresson, Estonian Minister of War in Exile (d. 1990)
 November 17 – Douglas Shearer, American film sound engineer (d. 1971)
 November 18 – Eugene Ormandy, Hungarian-American conductor (d. 1985)
 November 19 – Abu al-Qasim al-Khoei, Shia Ayatollah (d. 1992)
 November 21 – Jobyna Ralston, American actress (d. 1967)
 November 22
 Gualtiero De Angelis, Italian actor and voice actor (d. 1980)
 Hoagy Carmichael, American composer, pianist, singer, actor, and bandleader (d. 1981)
 November 23 – Manuel dos Reis Machado, Brazilian martial arts master (d. 1974)
 November 24 – Soraya Tarzi, Afghan feminist, queen (d. 1968)
 November 26
 Mona Bruns, American stage, film, radio, and television actress (d. 2000)
 Richard Hauptmann, German murderer of Charles Lindbergh Jr. (d. 1936)
 Maurice Rose, American general (d. 1945)
 November 29 – Emma Morano, Italian supercentenarian, oldest Italian ever, last surviving person born in the 1800s (d. 2017)

December 

 December 1 – Gaetano Lucchese, American gangster, boss of the Lucchese crime family (d. 1967)
 December 2
 John Barbirolli, English conductor (d. 1970)
 Ray Morehart, American baseball player (d. 1989)
 December 3 – Hayato Ikeda, Prime Minister of Japan (d. 1965)
 December 4 – Sam Newfield, American film director (d. 1964)
 December 8 – John Qualen, Canadian-American actor (d. 1987)
 December 9 – Jean de Brunhoff, French writer (d. 1937)
 December 11 – Joan Stevenson Abbott , Australian World War II army hospital matron (d. 1975)
 December 14 – DeFord Bailey, American country musician (d. 1982)
 December 15 – Harold Abrahams, British athlete (d. 1978)
 December 16
 Noël Coward, English actor, playwright, and composer (d. 1973)
 Aleksander Zawadzki, former President of Poland (d. 1964)
 December 18 – Peter Wessel Zapffe, Norwegian author and philosopher (d. 1990)
 December 19 – Martin Luther King Sr., American Baptist pastor, missionary, and early figure in the civil rights movement (d. 1984)
 December 20
Finn Ronne, Norwegian-American explorer (d. 1980)
John Sparkman, American politician (d. 1985)
 December 25
 Humphrey Bogart, American actor (d. 1957)
 Frank Ferguson, American actor (d. 1978)
 December 28 – Eugeniusz Bodo, Polish actor (d. 1943)
 December 29 – Nie Rongzhen, Chinese Communist military leader (d. 1992)
 December 31 – Friedrich Panse, German psychiatrist (d. 1973)

Date unknown
 Otto Klemperer, German physicist (d. 1987)
 Nureddine Rifai, 25th Prime Minister of Lebanon (d. 1980)

Deaths

January–February 

 January 1 – William Hugh Smith, 72, Governor of Alabama during Reconstruction, 1868 to 1870, former Alabama legislator who joined the Union Army 
 January 10 – 
Jonathan B. Turner, 93, U.S. educational reformer and champion of land grant universities, co-founder of the University of Illinois
William A. Russell, 67, U.S. Congressman and industrialist who was the first president of the International Paper Company
 January 13 – Nelson Dingley Jr., 66, U.S. politician and Congressman for Maine since 1881, author of the Dingley Act for increased tariffs
 January 14 – Nubar Pasha, 74, the first Prime Minister of Egypt (1878–79, 1884–88 and 1894–95)
 January 17 – Jedediah Hotchkiss, 70, American military cartographer for the Confederacy during the American Civil War
 January 23 – Romualdo Pacheco, 77, the only Hispanic Governor of the U.S. state of California (in 1875); (b. 1831)
 January 29 – Alfred Sisley, 59, French impressionist landscape painter, died of throat cancer (b. 1839)
 January 30 –Harry Bates, 48, British sculptor (b. 1850)
 January 31 – Princess Marie Louise of Bourbon-Parma, 29, princess consort of Bulgaria, from complications of childbirth (b. 1870)
 February 6
 Leo von Caprivi, Chancellor of Germany (b. 1831)
 Alfred, Hereditary Prince of Saxe-Coburg and Gotha (b. 1874)
 February 11 – Teuku Umar, Leader of Acehnese Rebellion (b. 1854)
 February 16 – Félix Faure, President of France (b. 1841)
 February 18 – Sophus Lie, Norwegian mathematician; see Lie group.(b. 1842)
 February 23 – Gaëtan de Rochebouët, Prime Minister of France (b. 1813)
 February 25 – Paul Reuter, German-born news agency founder (b. 1816)

March–April 
 March 3 – William P. Sprague, American politician from Ohio (b. 1827)
 March 6 – Princess Kaʻiulani, last monarch of Hawaii (b. 1875)
 March 12 – Sir Julius Vogel, Premier of New Zealand (b. 1835)
 March 18 – Othniel Charles Marsh, American palaeontologist (b. 1831)
 March 20 – Martha M. Place, American murderer, first woman executed in the electric chair (b. 1849)
 March 24 – Marie Goegg-Pouchoulin, Swiss national, international women's rights activist, pacifist (b. 1826)
 April 1 – Charles C. Carpenter, American admiral (b. 1834)
 April 5 – T. E. Ellis, Welsh politician (b. 1859)
 April 6 – Garret Parry, Irish piper (b. 1847)
 April 7 – Pieter Rijke, Dutch physicist (b. 1812)
 April 11 – Lascăr Catargiu, 4-time prime minister of Romania (b. 1823)
 April 16 – Emilio Jacinto, Filipino poet, revolutionary (b. 1875)
 April 22 – 
Sir John Mowbray, 1st Baronet, British MP and Father of the House of Commons since 1898 (b. 1815)
Johann Köler, Estonian painter (b. 1826)
 April 24 – Richard J. Oglesby, U.S. politician, three-time Governor of Illinois for whom the town of Oglesby, Illinois is named (b. 1824)
 April 26 – Count Karl Sigmund von Hohenwart, Minister-President of Austria, 1871 (b. 1824)
 April 30 – Lewis Baker, U.S. politician and diplomat (b. 1832)

May–June 
 May 16 – William Nast, German-born religious leader and founder of the German Methodist Church in the U.S. (b. 1807)
 May 19 – Charles R. Buckalew, American politician and diplomat (b. 1821)
 May 24 – William Brett, 1st Viscount Esher, British law lord (b. 1817)
 May 25 – Emilio Castelar y Ripoll, President of the First Spanish Republic (b. 1832)
 June 3 – Johann Strauss Jr., Austrian composer (b. 1825)
 June 4 – Eugenio Beltrami, Italian mathematician (b. 1835)
 June 5 – Antonio Luna, Filipino general (assassinated) (b. 1866)
 June 7 – Augustin Daly, American theatrical impresario, playwright (b. 1838)
 June 10 – Ernest Chausson, French composer (b. 1855)

July–August 

 July 1 – Sir William Flower, British museum curator and surgeon (b. 1831)
 July 2 – General Horatio Wright, 79, American engineer, U.S. Army officer in the American Civil War, Chief of Engineers for the U.S. Army Corps of Engineers (b. 1820)
 July 4 – Sir Alexander Armstrong, 81, Irish-born physician, Royal Navy officer and Arctic explorer (b. 1818)
 July 10 – 
Grand Duke George Alexandrovich of Russia, 28, Tsarevich and heir to the throne of Russia as younger brother of Nicholas II (b. 1871)
Albert Grévy, French statesman and Governor-General of Algeria 1879-1881 (b. 1823) 
 July 16 –  
Margaretta Riley, British botanist (b. 1804) 
William Preston Johnston, 68, American college administrator and first president of Tulane University (b. 1831)
 July 18 – Horatio Alger Jr., American writer (b. 1832)
 July 20 – Frances Laughton Mace, American poet (b. 1836)
 July 21 – Robert G. Ingersoll, American politician (b. 1833)
 July 27 – Tassilo von Heydebrand und der Lasa, German chess-master (b. 1818)
 August 4 – Karl, Freiherr von Prel, German philosopher (b. 1839)
 August 9 
 Sir Edward Frankland, British chemist (b. 1825)
 Grand Duke George Alexandrovich of Russia, Russian Grand Duke, younger brother of Nicholas II of Russia (b. 1871)
 August 16 – Robert Bunsen, German chemist (b. 1811)

September–October 
 September 2 – Ernest Renshaw, British tennis player (b. 1861)
 September 12 – Cornelius Vanderbilt II, American railway magnate (b. 1843)
 September 13 – Sarah Warren Keeler, American educator of the deaf-mute (b. 1844)
 September 17 – Charles Alfred Pillsbury, American industrialist (b. 1842)
 September 28 – Giovanni Segantini, Italian painter (b. 1858)
 October 2 
 Emma Hardinge Britten, British writer (b. 1823)
 Percy Pilcher, British aviation pioneer, glider pilot (b. 1866)
 October 7 – Deodato Arellano, Filipino Propagandist (b. 1844)
 October 14
 Anna Cabot Lowell Quincy Waterston, American diarist (b. 1812)
Nicolai Hanson, Norwegian zoologist and Antarctic explorer (b. 1870)
 October 22 – Ella Hoag Brockway Avann, American educator (b. 1853)
 October 23 – Sir Penn Symons, British general (died of wounds) (b. 1843)
 October 25 – Grant Allen, Canadian science writer and novelist (b. 1848)
 October 30 
 Sir Arthur Blomfield, British architect (b. 1829)
 William Henry Webb, American industrialist, philanthropist (b. 1816)
 October 31 – Anton Berindei, Wallachian-born Romanian general and politician (b. 1838)

November–December 

 November 16
 Vincas Kudirka, Lithuanian doctor, poet, and national hero (b. 1858)
 Julius Hermann Moritz Busch, German publicist (b. 1821)
 November 21 – Garret Hobart, 24th Vice President of the United States (b. 1844)
 November 23 – Thomas Henry Ismay, British owner of the White Star Line (b. 1837)
 November 24 – Abdallahi ibn Muhammad, Sudanese political, religious leader (killed in battle) (b. 1846)
 November 28 – Virginia Oldoini, Countess of Castiglione (b. 1837)
 December 2 – Gregorio del Pilar, Filipino general (killed in battle) (b. 1875)
 December 10 – King Ngwane V of Swaziland (b. 1876)
 December 19 – Henry Ware Lawton, American general (killed in action) (b. 1843)
 December 22
 Pascual Ortega Portales Chilean painter (b.1839)
 Dwight L. Moody, American evangelist (b. 1837)
 Hugh Grosvenor, 1st Duke of Westminster, British landowner and politician (b. 1825)
 December 30
Eugène Bertrand, 65, French comedian and opera house director (b. 1834)
 December 31
 Jane Mitchel, Irish nationalist (b. c. 1820)
 Carl Millocker, 57, Viennese composer (b. 1842)
 Manuel Carrillo Tablas, 77, Mexican philanthropist and mayor of Orizaba (b. 1822)

References